

408001–408100 

|-bgcolor=#d6d6d6
| 408001 ||  || — || March 15, 2007 || Mount Lemmon || Mount Lemmon Survey || — || align=right | 2.9 km || 
|-id=002 bgcolor=#d6d6d6
| 408002 ||  || — || August 15, 2009 || Kitt Peak || Spacewatch || — || align=right | 3.1 km || 
|-id=003 bgcolor=#d6d6d6
| 408003 ||  || — || January 19, 2012 || Mount Lemmon || Mount Lemmon Survey || — || align=right | 2.3 km || 
|-id=004 bgcolor=#d6d6d6
| 408004 ||  || — || February 21, 2007 || Kitt Peak || Spacewatch || KOR || align=right | 1.1 km || 
|-id=005 bgcolor=#d6d6d6
| 408005 ||  || — || September 30, 2003 || Kitt Peak || Spacewatch || — || align=right | 3.6 km || 
|-id=006 bgcolor=#E9E9E9
| 408006 ||  || — || July 6, 2010 || WISE || WISE || — || align=right | 1.5 km || 
|-id=007 bgcolor=#fefefe
| 408007 ||  || — || February 7, 2008 || Kitt Peak || Spacewatch || — || align=right data-sort-value="0.82" | 820 m || 
|-id=008 bgcolor=#E9E9E9
| 408008 ||  || — || January 28, 2007 || Mount Lemmon || Mount Lemmon Survey || — || align=right | 2.6 km || 
|-id=009 bgcolor=#E9E9E9
| 408009 ||  || — || October 7, 2005 || Kitt Peak || Spacewatch || — || align=right | 2.0 km || 
|-id=010 bgcolor=#d6d6d6
| 408010 ||  || — || October 26, 2005 || Kitt Peak || Spacewatch || — || align=right | 2.8 km || 
|-id=011 bgcolor=#d6d6d6
| 408011 ||  || — || August 17, 2009 || Kitt Peak || Spacewatch || — || align=right | 3.3 km || 
|-id=012 bgcolor=#d6d6d6
| 408012 ||  || — || October 20, 1998 || Kitt Peak || Spacewatch || EOS || align=right | 2.1 km || 
|-id=013 bgcolor=#E9E9E9
| 408013 ||  || — || November 23, 2006 || Mount Lemmon || Mount Lemmon Survey || — || align=right | 2.4 km || 
|-id=014 bgcolor=#d6d6d6
| 408014 ||  || — || April 24, 2007 || Mount Lemmon || Mount Lemmon Survey || — || align=right | 2.8 km || 
|-id=015 bgcolor=#d6d6d6
| 408015 ||  || — || April 11, 2007 || Catalina || CSS || — || align=right | 3.6 km || 
|-id=016 bgcolor=#E9E9E9
| 408016 ||  || — || March 31, 2008 || Mount Lemmon || Mount Lemmon Survey || — || align=right | 2.0 km || 
|-id=017 bgcolor=#E9E9E9
| 408017 ||  || — || May 3, 2008 || Kitt Peak || Spacewatch || — || align=right | 2.2 km || 
|-id=018 bgcolor=#d6d6d6
| 408018 ||  || — || February 4, 2006 || Kitt Peak || Spacewatch || — || align=right | 3.1 km || 
|-id=019 bgcolor=#E9E9E9
| 408019 ||  || — || October 10, 2010 || Kitt Peak || Spacewatch || EUN || align=right | 1.4 km || 
|-id=020 bgcolor=#E9E9E9
| 408020 ||  || — || November 10, 2005 || Mount Lemmon || Mount Lemmon Survey || — || align=right | 2.5 km || 
|-id=021 bgcolor=#E9E9E9
| 408021 ||  || — || September 10, 2010 || Kitt Peak || Spacewatch || — || align=right | 1.3 km || 
|-id=022 bgcolor=#d6d6d6
| 408022 ||  || — || September 10, 2004 || Kitt Peak || Spacewatch || — || align=right | 2.9 km || 
|-id=023 bgcolor=#d6d6d6
| 408023 ||  || — || September 15, 2009 || Kitt Peak || Spacewatch || — || align=right | 3.1 km || 
|-id=024 bgcolor=#d6d6d6
| 408024 ||  || — || January 31, 2006 || Mount Lemmon || Mount Lemmon Survey || — || align=right | 2.3 km || 
|-id=025 bgcolor=#d6d6d6
| 408025 ||  || — || May 13, 2007 || Mount Lemmon || Mount Lemmon Survey || LIX || align=right | 3.5 km || 
|-id=026 bgcolor=#d6d6d6
| 408026 ||  || — || January 23, 2006 || Kitt Peak || Spacewatch || — || align=right | 4.1 km || 
|-id=027 bgcolor=#d6d6d6
| 408027 ||  || — || March 16, 2007 || Kitt Peak || Spacewatch || — || align=right | 3.1 km || 
|-id=028 bgcolor=#d6d6d6
| 408028 ||  || — || February 26, 2007 || Mount Lemmon || Mount Lemmon Survey || KOR || align=right | 1.5 km || 
|-id=029 bgcolor=#d6d6d6
| 408029 ||  || — || September 29, 2003 || Kitt Peak || Spacewatch || — || align=right | 3.9 km || 
|-id=030 bgcolor=#d6d6d6
| 408030 ||  || — || August 17, 2009 || Kitt Peak || Spacewatch || EOS || align=right | 2.0 km || 
|-id=031 bgcolor=#E9E9E9
| 408031 ||  || — || April 6, 2008 || Kitt Peak || Spacewatch || — || align=right | 1.5 km || 
|-id=032 bgcolor=#d6d6d6
| 408032 ||  || — || March 13, 2007 || Mount Lemmon || Mount Lemmon Survey || — || align=right | 2.6 km || 
|-id=033 bgcolor=#d6d6d6
| 408033 ||  || — || January 7, 2006 || Kitt Peak || Spacewatch || — || align=right | 4.3 km || 
|-id=034 bgcolor=#fefefe
| 408034 ||  || — || December 19, 2003 || Socorro || LINEAR || NYS || align=right data-sort-value="0.78" | 780 m || 
|-id=035 bgcolor=#d6d6d6
| 408035 ||  || — || October 1, 2003 || Kitt Peak || Spacewatch || — || align=right | 2.8 km || 
|-id=036 bgcolor=#E9E9E9
| 408036 ||  || — || January 27, 2007 || Mount Lemmon || Mount Lemmon Survey || — || align=right | 1.7 km || 
|-id=037 bgcolor=#d6d6d6
| 408037 ||  || — || November 3, 2005 || Kitt Peak || Spacewatch || — || align=right | 2.2 km || 
|-id=038 bgcolor=#d6d6d6
| 408038 ||  || — || March 14, 2007 || Mount Lemmon || Mount Lemmon Survey || EOS || align=right | 2.0 km || 
|-id=039 bgcolor=#d6d6d6
| 408039 ||  || — || March 20, 2007 || Kitt Peak || Spacewatch || — || align=right | 2.5 km || 
|-id=040 bgcolor=#d6d6d6
| 408040 ||  || — || March 14, 2007 || Mount Lemmon || Mount Lemmon Survey || — || align=right | 2.9 km || 
|-id=041 bgcolor=#d6d6d6
| 408041 ||  || — || October 23, 2004 || Kitt Peak || Spacewatch || — || align=right | 3.1 km || 
|-id=042 bgcolor=#d6d6d6
| 408042 ||  || — || October 11, 2004 || Kitt Peak || Spacewatch || — || align=right | 2.9 km || 
|-id=043 bgcolor=#d6d6d6
| 408043 ||  || — || April 19, 2007 || Mount Lemmon || Mount Lemmon Survey || — || align=right | 3.4 km || 
|-id=044 bgcolor=#d6d6d6
| 408044 ||  || — || August 28, 2009 || Kitt Peak || Spacewatch || — || align=right | 2.7 km || 
|-id=045 bgcolor=#d6d6d6
| 408045 ||  || — || February 27, 2006 || Catalina || CSS || — || align=right | 4.7 km || 
|-id=046 bgcolor=#E9E9E9
| 408046 ||  || — || October 24, 2001 || Socorro || LINEAR || — || align=right | 1.6 km || 
|-id=047 bgcolor=#E9E9E9
| 408047 ||  || — || November 7, 2010 || Catalina || CSS || — || align=right | 1.3 km || 
|-id=048 bgcolor=#d6d6d6
| 408048 ||  || — || January 23, 2006 || Kitt Peak || Spacewatch || HYG || align=right | 3.1 km || 
|-id=049 bgcolor=#d6d6d6
| 408049 ||  || — || March 21, 2001 || Anderson Mesa || LONEOS || TIR || align=right | 3.6 km || 
|-id=050 bgcolor=#d6d6d6
| 408050 ||  || — || January 9, 2006 || Kitt Peak || Spacewatch || — || align=right | 3.4 km || 
|-id=051 bgcolor=#E9E9E9
| 408051 ||  || — || November 13, 2006 || Catalina || CSS || — || align=right | 1.8 km || 
|-id=052 bgcolor=#d6d6d6
| 408052 ||  || — || January 4, 2006 || Mount Lemmon || Mount Lemmon Survey || URS || align=right | 4.5 km || 
|-id=053 bgcolor=#d6d6d6
| 408053 ||  || — || January 26, 2006 || Catalina || CSS || EOS || align=right | 2.7 km || 
|-id=054 bgcolor=#d6d6d6
| 408054 ||  || — || March 15, 2007 || Mount Lemmon || Mount Lemmon Survey || — || align=right | 3.4 km || 
|-id=055 bgcolor=#d6d6d6
| 408055 ||  || — || September 22, 2009 || Kitt Peak || Spacewatch || — || align=right | 4.0 km || 
|-id=056 bgcolor=#d6d6d6
| 408056 ||  || — || April 23, 2007 || Mount Lemmon || Mount Lemmon Survey || EOS || align=right | 2.4 km || 
|-id=057 bgcolor=#d6d6d6
| 408057 ||  || — || November 11, 2004 || Kitt Peak || Spacewatch || EOS || align=right | 2.8 km || 
|-id=058 bgcolor=#d6d6d6
| 408058 ||  || — || March 19, 2007 || Mount Lemmon || Mount Lemmon Survey || EOS || align=right | 2.6 km || 
|-id=059 bgcolor=#d6d6d6
| 408059 ||  || — || January 5, 2006 || Kitt Peak || Spacewatch || EOS || align=right | 2.6 km || 
|-id=060 bgcolor=#E9E9E9
| 408060 ||  || — || April 27, 2008 || Mount Lemmon || Mount Lemmon Survey || — || align=right | 3.2 km || 
|-id=061 bgcolor=#fefefe
| 408061 ||  || — || February 18, 2008 || Mount Lemmon || Mount Lemmon Survey || V || align=right data-sort-value="0.80" | 800 m || 
|-id=062 bgcolor=#d6d6d6
| 408062 ||  || — || November 13, 2010 || Kitt Peak || Spacewatch || — || align=right | 2.5 km || 
|-id=063 bgcolor=#d6d6d6
| 408063 ||  || — || November 3, 2004 || Kitt Peak || Spacewatch || — || align=right | 3.5 km || 
|-id=064 bgcolor=#d6d6d6
| 408064 ||  || — || September 18, 2003 || Kitt Peak || Spacewatch || — || align=right | 4.1 km || 
|-id=065 bgcolor=#d6d6d6
| 408065 ||  || — || February 27, 2006 || Mount Lemmon || Mount Lemmon Survey || — || align=right | 3.6 km || 
|-id=066 bgcolor=#d6d6d6
| 408066 ||  || — || October 3, 2003 || Kitt Peak || Spacewatch || — || align=right | 4.6 km || 
|-id=067 bgcolor=#d6d6d6
| 408067 ||  || — || November 8, 2009 || Mount Lemmon || Mount Lemmon Survey || — || align=right | 2.7 km || 
|-id=068 bgcolor=#E9E9E9
| 408068 ||  || — || October 22, 2005 || Kitt Peak || Spacewatch || — || align=right | 2.6 km || 
|-id=069 bgcolor=#d6d6d6
| 408069 ||  || — || March 14, 2007 || Mount Lemmon || Mount Lemmon Survey || — || align=right | 3.1 km || 
|-id=070 bgcolor=#d6d6d6
| 408070 ||  || — || January 28, 2011 || Mount Lemmon || Mount Lemmon Survey || — || align=right | 2.9 km || 
|-id=071 bgcolor=#d6d6d6
| 408071 ||  || — || April 22, 2007 || Mount Lemmon || Mount Lemmon Survey || — || align=right | 2.9 km || 
|-id=072 bgcolor=#d6d6d6
| 408072 ||  || — || September 20, 2003 || Campo Imperatore || CINEOS || — || align=right | 3.8 km || 
|-id=073 bgcolor=#d6d6d6
| 408073 ||  || — || February 20, 2006 || Kitt Peak || Spacewatch || — || align=right | 3.0 km || 
|-id=074 bgcolor=#E9E9E9
| 408074 ||  || — || March 14, 1999 || Kitt Peak || Spacewatch || — || align=right | 1.7 km || 
|-id=075 bgcolor=#d6d6d6
| 408075 ||  || — || March 13, 2002 || Kitt Peak || Spacewatch || — || align=right | 3.0 km || 
|-id=076 bgcolor=#d6d6d6
| 408076 ||  || — || March 24, 2006 || Kitt Peak || Spacewatch || — || align=right | 3.7 km || 
|-id=077 bgcolor=#d6d6d6
| 408077 ||  || — || March 5, 2006 || Kitt Peak || Spacewatch || — || align=right | 3.0 km || 
|-id=078 bgcolor=#d6d6d6
| 408078 ||  || — || April 29, 2006 || Anderson Mesa || LONEOS || 7:4 || align=right | 4.3 km || 
|-id=079 bgcolor=#d6d6d6
| 408079 ||  || — || February 24, 2006 || Kitt Peak || Spacewatch || EOS || align=right | 2.2 km || 
|-id=080 bgcolor=#d6d6d6
| 408080 ||  || — || November 17, 1999 || Kitt Peak || Spacewatch || — || align=right | 2.9 km || 
|-id=081 bgcolor=#d6d6d6
| 408081 ||  || — || September 9, 2004 || Kitt Peak || Spacewatch || EOS || align=right | 2.0 km || 
|-id=082 bgcolor=#d6d6d6
| 408082 ||  || — || March 31, 1995 || Kitt Peak || Spacewatch || — || align=right | 3.4 km || 
|-id=083 bgcolor=#d6d6d6
| 408083 ||  || — || January 13, 2011 || Kitt Peak || Spacewatch || — || align=right | 3.4 km || 
|-id=084 bgcolor=#d6d6d6
| 408084 ||  || — || March 30, 2001 || Kitt Peak || Spacewatch || EOS || align=right | 2.2 km || 
|-id=085 bgcolor=#d6d6d6
| 408085 ||  || — || February 27, 2006 || Kitt Peak || Spacewatch || — || align=right | 2.7 km || 
|-id=086 bgcolor=#d6d6d6
| 408086 ||  || — || January 31, 2006 || Catalina || CSS || — || align=right | 3.5 km || 
|-id=087 bgcolor=#d6d6d6
| 408087 ||  || — || March 9, 2006 || Kitt Peak || Spacewatch || — || align=right | 3.7 km || 
|-id=088 bgcolor=#E9E9E9
| 408088 ||  || — || September 22, 2001 || Kitt Peak || Spacewatch || HNS || align=right | 1.5 km || 
|-id=089 bgcolor=#d6d6d6
| 408089 ||  || — || September 20, 2009 || Kitt Peak || Spacewatch || EOS || align=right | 2.4 km || 
|-id=090 bgcolor=#d6d6d6
| 408090 ||  || — || April 20, 2007 || Kitt Peak || Spacewatch || — || align=right | 3.0 km || 
|-id=091 bgcolor=#d6d6d6
| 408091 ||  || — || October 17, 1998 || Kitt Peak || Spacewatch || — || align=right | 4.2 km || 
|-id=092 bgcolor=#d6d6d6
| 408092 ||  || — || March 24, 2006 || Kitt Peak || Spacewatch || LUT || align=right | 6.6 km || 
|-id=093 bgcolor=#d6d6d6
| 408093 ||  || — || September 15, 2009 || Kitt Peak || Spacewatch || — || align=right | 3.3 km || 
|-id=094 bgcolor=#d6d6d6
| 408094 ||  || — || November 25, 1998 || Kitt Peak || Spacewatch || — || align=right | 3.2 km || 
|-id=095 bgcolor=#d6d6d6
| 408095 ||  || — || October 21, 2008 || Mount Lemmon || Mount Lemmon Survey || SYL7:4 || align=right | 4.1 km || 
|-id=096 bgcolor=#d6d6d6
| 408096 ||  || — || September 22, 2003 || Kitt Peak || Spacewatch || — || align=right | 3.1 km || 
|-id=097 bgcolor=#FA8072
| 408097 ||  || — || October 9, 2007 || Catalina || CSS || H || align=right data-sort-value="0.76" | 760 m || 
|-id=098 bgcolor=#fefefe
| 408098 ||  || — || May 10, 2005 || Anderson Mesa || LONEOS || — || align=right data-sort-value="0.54" | 540 m || 
|-id=099 bgcolor=#fefefe
| 408099 ||  || — || March 17, 2010 || Kitt Peak || Spacewatch || — || align=right data-sort-value="0.61" | 610 m || 
|-id=100 bgcolor=#fefefe
| 408100 ||  || — || January 10, 2008 || Mount Lemmon || Mount Lemmon Survey || H || align=right data-sort-value="0.75" | 750 m || 
|}

408101–408200 

|-bgcolor=#fefefe
| 408101 ||  || — || February 17, 2010 || Kitt Peak || Spacewatch || — || align=right data-sort-value="0.56" | 560 m || 
|-id=102 bgcolor=#E9E9E9
| 408102 ||  || — || May 11, 2010 || WISE || WISE || — || align=right | 1.7 km || 
|-id=103 bgcolor=#fefefe
| 408103 ||  || — || February 7, 2002 || Kitt Peak || Spacewatch || H || align=right data-sort-value="0.51" | 510 m || 
|-id=104 bgcolor=#fefefe
| 408104 ||  || — || December 31, 2008 || Kitt Peak || Spacewatch || NYS || align=right data-sort-value="0.76" | 760 m || 
|-id=105 bgcolor=#fefefe
| 408105 ||  || — || January 19, 2005 || Kitt Peak || Spacewatch || — || align=right data-sort-value="0.52" | 520 m || 
|-id=106 bgcolor=#E9E9E9
| 408106 ||  || — || November 2, 2007 || Kitt Peak || Spacewatch || — || align=right | 1.9 km || 
|-id=107 bgcolor=#E9E9E9
| 408107 ||  || — || November 8, 2010 || Mount Lemmon || Mount Lemmon Survey || — || align=right | 2.7 km || 
|-id=108 bgcolor=#fefefe
| 408108 ||  || — || January 30, 2009 || Mount Lemmon || Mount Lemmon Survey || — || align=right data-sort-value="0.82" | 820 m || 
|-id=109 bgcolor=#E9E9E9
| 408109 ||  || — || January 2, 2009 || Kitt Peak || Spacewatch || — || align=right | 2.2 km || 
|-id=110 bgcolor=#fefefe
| 408110 ||  || — || May 11, 2007 || Mount Lemmon || Mount Lemmon Survey || — || align=right data-sort-value="0.77" | 770 m || 
|-id=111 bgcolor=#fefefe
| 408111 ||  || — || January 23, 2006 || Kitt Peak || Spacewatch || — || align=right data-sort-value="0.79" | 790 m || 
|-id=112 bgcolor=#fefefe
| 408112 ||  || — || February 10, 2010 || WISE || WISE || — || align=right | 2.0 km || 
|-id=113 bgcolor=#fefefe
| 408113 ||  || — || January 31, 2006 || Mount Lemmon || Mount Lemmon Survey || MAS || align=right data-sort-value="0.85" | 850 m || 
|-id=114 bgcolor=#fefefe
| 408114 ||  || — || October 18, 2007 || Mount Lemmon || Mount Lemmon Survey || — || align=right data-sort-value="0.87" | 870 m || 
|-id=115 bgcolor=#fefefe
| 408115 ||  || — || December 7, 2008 || Mount Lemmon || Mount Lemmon Survey || — || align=right | 2.8 km || 
|-id=116 bgcolor=#fefefe
| 408116 ||  || — || September 19, 2011 || Mount Lemmon || Mount Lemmon Survey || — || align=right data-sort-value="0.61" | 610 m || 
|-id=117 bgcolor=#fefefe
| 408117 ||  || — || November 9, 2009 || Mount Lemmon || Mount Lemmon Survey || H || align=right data-sort-value="0.86" | 860 m || 
|-id=118 bgcolor=#fefefe
| 408118 ||  || — || April 20, 2006 || Kitt Peak || Spacewatch || NYS || align=right data-sort-value="0.63" | 630 m || 
|-id=119 bgcolor=#fefefe
| 408119 ||  || — || January 5, 2006 || Mount Lemmon || Mount Lemmon Survey || — || align=right data-sort-value="0.93" | 930 m || 
|-id=120 bgcolor=#fefefe
| 408120 ||  || — || March 25, 2006 || Kitt Peak || Spacewatch || — || align=right data-sort-value="0.90" | 900 m || 
|-id=121 bgcolor=#E9E9E9
| 408121 ||  || — || October 16, 2007 || Mount Lemmon || Mount Lemmon Survey || — || align=right | 1.0 km || 
|-id=122 bgcolor=#fefefe
| 408122 ||  || — || December 4, 2008 || Kitt Peak || Spacewatch || — || align=right data-sort-value="0.65" | 650 m || 
|-id=123 bgcolor=#fefefe
| 408123 ||  || — || April 10, 2005 || Catalina || CSS || H || align=right | 1.2 km || 
|-id=124 bgcolor=#fefefe
| 408124 ||  || — || January 5, 2006 || Catalina || CSS || — || align=right data-sort-value="0.76" | 760 m || 
|-id=125 bgcolor=#fefefe
| 408125 ||  || — || January 25, 2002 || Socorro || LINEAR || H || align=right data-sort-value="0.74" | 740 m || 
|-id=126 bgcolor=#fefefe
| 408126 ||  || — || March 17, 2010 || Kitt Peak || Spacewatch || — || align=right | 1.1 km || 
|-id=127 bgcolor=#fefefe
| 408127 ||  || — || September 10, 2007 || Kitt Peak || Spacewatch || NYS || align=right data-sort-value="0.88" | 880 m || 
|-id=128 bgcolor=#d6d6d6
| 408128 ||  || — || July 22, 2010 || WISE || WISE || — || align=right | 5.1 km || 
|-id=129 bgcolor=#fefefe
| 408129 ||  || — || December 8, 2012 || Mount Lemmon || Mount Lemmon Survey || V || align=right data-sort-value="0.72" | 720 m || 
|-id=130 bgcolor=#fefefe
| 408130 ||  || — || September 23, 2011 || Kitt Peak || Spacewatch || — || align=right data-sort-value="0.72" | 720 m || 
|-id=131 bgcolor=#fefefe
| 408131 ||  || — || February 1, 2006 || Kitt Peak || Spacewatch || — || align=right data-sort-value="0.59" | 590 m || 
|-id=132 bgcolor=#E9E9E9
| 408132 ||  || — || March 2, 2009 || Mount Lemmon || Mount Lemmon Survey || — || align=right | 1.3 km || 
|-id=133 bgcolor=#fefefe
| 408133 ||  || — || December 6, 2005 || Kitt Peak || Spacewatch || — || align=right data-sort-value="0.63" | 630 m || 
|-id=134 bgcolor=#fefefe
| 408134 ||  || — || February 20, 2006 || Kitt Peak || Spacewatch || — || align=right data-sort-value="0.63" | 630 m || 
|-id=135 bgcolor=#fefefe
| 408135 ||  || — || April 4, 2010 || Kitt Peak || Spacewatch || — || align=right data-sort-value="0.68" | 680 m || 
|-id=136 bgcolor=#fefefe
| 408136 ||  || — || February 15, 2010 || Kitt Peak || Spacewatch || — || align=right data-sort-value="0.59" | 590 m || 
|-id=137 bgcolor=#fefefe
| 408137 ||  || — || December 7, 2008 || Mount Lemmon || Mount Lemmon Survey || — || align=right data-sort-value="0.74" | 740 m || 
|-id=138 bgcolor=#E9E9E9
| 408138 ||  || — || September 10, 2010 || Mount Lemmon || Mount Lemmon Survey || — || align=right | 1.8 km || 
|-id=139 bgcolor=#fefefe
| 408139 ||  || — || January 23, 2006 || Kitt Peak || Spacewatch || — || align=right data-sort-value="0.80" | 800 m || 
|-id=140 bgcolor=#fefefe
| 408140 ||  || — || March 18, 2010 || Mount Lemmon || Mount Lemmon Survey || — || align=right data-sort-value="0.82" | 820 m || 
|-id=141 bgcolor=#fefefe
| 408141 ||  || — || January 23, 2006 || Kitt Peak || Spacewatch || — || align=right data-sort-value="0.92" | 920 m || 
|-id=142 bgcolor=#E9E9E9
| 408142 ||  || — || October 2, 2006 || Mount Lemmon || Mount Lemmon Survey || — || align=right | 1.6 km || 
|-id=143 bgcolor=#E9E9E9
| 408143 ||  || — || April 29, 1997 || Kitt Peak || Spacewatch || — || align=right data-sort-value="0.89" | 890 m || 
|-id=144 bgcolor=#fefefe
| 408144 ||  || — || December 3, 2008 || Mount Lemmon || Mount Lemmon Survey || — || align=right data-sort-value="0.96" | 960 m || 
|-id=145 bgcolor=#fefefe
| 408145 ||  || — || March 30, 2010 || WISE || WISE || — || align=right | 2.1 km || 
|-id=146 bgcolor=#E9E9E9
| 408146 ||  || — || April 14, 1997 || Kitt Peak || Spacewatch || — || align=right data-sort-value="0.84" | 840 m || 
|-id=147 bgcolor=#fefefe
| 408147 ||  || — || January 16, 2013 || Mount Lemmon || Mount Lemmon Survey || — || align=right data-sort-value="0.98" | 980 m || 
|-id=148 bgcolor=#fefefe
| 408148 ||  || — || March 19, 2010 || Mount Lemmon || Mount Lemmon Survey || — || align=right data-sort-value="0.70" | 700 m || 
|-id=149 bgcolor=#E9E9E9
| 408149 ||  || — || February 1, 2000 || Kitt Peak || Spacewatch || HNS || align=right | 1.3 km || 
|-id=150 bgcolor=#E9E9E9
| 408150 ||  || — || February 28, 2009 || Kitt Peak || Spacewatch || — || align=right data-sort-value="0.92" | 920 m || 
|-id=151 bgcolor=#fefefe
| 408151 ||  || — || January 9, 2013 || Mount Lemmon || Mount Lemmon Survey || — || align=right data-sort-value="0.82" | 820 m || 
|-id=152 bgcolor=#fefefe
| 408152 ||  || — || April 10, 2010 || Kitt Peak || Spacewatch || — || align=right data-sort-value="0.74" | 740 m || 
|-id=153 bgcolor=#fefefe
| 408153 ||  || — || October 7, 2005 || Mount Lemmon || Mount Lemmon Survey || — || align=right data-sort-value="0.53" | 530 m || 
|-id=154 bgcolor=#fefefe
| 408154 ||  || — || February 17, 2010 || Kitt Peak || Spacewatch || — || align=right data-sort-value="0.66" | 660 m || 
|-id=155 bgcolor=#fefefe
| 408155 ||  || — || September 12, 2001 || Socorro || LINEAR || — || align=right data-sort-value="0.87" | 870 m || 
|-id=156 bgcolor=#E9E9E9
| 408156 ||  || — || January 9, 2013 || Mount Lemmon || Mount Lemmon Survey || — || align=right data-sort-value="0.94" | 940 m || 
|-id=157 bgcolor=#fefefe
| 408157 ||  || — || April 12, 2010 || Kitt Peak || Spacewatch || — || align=right data-sort-value="0.63" | 630 m || 
|-id=158 bgcolor=#E9E9E9
| 408158 ||  || — || January 29, 2009 || Mount Lemmon || Mount Lemmon Survey || — || align=right data-sort-value="0.94" | 940 m || 
|-id=159 bgcolor=#fefefe
| 408159 ||  || — || December 10, 2005 || Kitt Peak || Spacewatch || — || align=right data-sort-value="0.55" | 550 m || 
|-id=160 bgcolor=#E9E9E9
| 408160 ||  || — || May 29, 2010 || WISE || WISE || — || align=right | 2.2 km || 
|-id=161 bgcolor=#fefefe
| 408161 ||  || — || April 7, 2006 || Kitt Peak || Spacewatch || NYS || align=right data-sort-value="0.50" | 500 m || 
|-id=162 bgcolor=#fefefe
| 408162 ||  || — || April 11, 2003 || Kitt Peak || Spacewatch || — || align=right data-sort-value="0.68" | 680 m || 
|-id=163 bgcolor=#fefefe
| 408163 ||  || — || September 5, 2007 || Catalina || CSS || — || align=right | 1.1 km || 
|-id=164 bgcolor=#fefefe
| 408164 ||  || — || May 11, 2010 || Mount Lemmon || Mount Lemmon Survey || — || align=right data-sort-value="0.70" | 700 m || 
|-id=165 bgcolor=#fefefe
| 408165 ||  || — || December 29, 2008 || Mount Lemmon || Mount Lemmon Survey || — || align=right data-sort-value="0.70" | 700 m || 
|-id=166 bgcolor=#E9E9E9
| 408166 ||  || — || April 20, 2009 || Mount Lemmon || Mount Lemmon Survey || — || align=right | 1.9 km || 
|-id=167 bgcolor=#fefefe
| 408167 ||  || — || November 7, 2001 || Socorro || LINEAR || PHO || align=right data-sort-value="0.91" | 910 m || 
|-id=168 bgcolor=#E9E9E9
| 408168 ||  || — || June 8, 2005 || Kitt Peak || Spacewatch || — || align=right | 1.3 km || 
|-id=169 bgcolor=#E9E9E9
| 408169 ||  || — || November 18, 2011 || Mount Lemmon || Mount Lemmon Survey || — || align=right | 1.2 km || 
|-id=170 bgcolor=#fefefe
| 408170 ||  || — || October 18, 2007 || Mount Lemmon || Mount Lemmon Survey || NYS || align=right data-sort-value="0.76" | 760 m || 
|-id=171 bgcolor=#E9E9E9
| 408171 ||  || — || May 1, 2009 || Mount Lemmon || Mount Lemmon Survey || — || align=right | 2.0 km || 
|-id=172 bgcolor=#fefefe
| 408172 ||  || — || April 10, 2002 || Socorro || LINEAR || — || align=right data-sort-value="0.90" | 900 m || 
|-id=173 bgcolor=#fefefe
| 408173 ||  || — || November 18, 2007 || Mount Lemmon || Mount Lemmon Survey || — || align=right | 1.4 km || 
|-id=174 bgcolor=#E9E9E9
| 408174 ||  || — || May 9, 2005 || Kitt Peak || Spacewatch || — || align=right | 2.6 km || 
|-id=175 bgcolor=#E9E9E9
| 408175 ||  || — || January 9, 2013 || Mount Lemmon || Mount Lemmon Survey || — || align=right data-sort-value="0.89" | 890 m || 
|-id=176 bgcolor=#fefefe
| 408176 ||  || — || March 9, 2002 || Kitt Peak || Spacewatch || NYS || align=right data-sort-value="0.58" | 580 m || 
|-id=177 bgcolor=#fefefe
| 408177 ||  || — || March 16, 2010 || Mount Lemmon || Mount Lemmon Survey || — || align=right data-sort-value="0.55" | 550 m || 
|-id=178 bgcolor=#FA8072
| 408178 ||  || — || September 25, 2009 || Catalina || CSS || H || align=right data-sort-value="0.78" | 780 m || 
|-id=179 bgcolor=#fefefe
| 408179 ||  || — || January 3, 2009 || Kitt Peak || Spacewatch || — || align=right data-sort-value="0.71" | 710 m || 
|-id=180 bgcolor=#E9E9E9
| 408180 ||  || — || July 6, 2010 || WISE || WISE || — || align=right | 2.2 km || 
|-id=181 bgcolor=#E9E9E9
| 408181 ||  || — || December 29, 2008 || Mount Lemmon || Mount Lemmon Survey || — || align=right | 1.1 km || 
|-id=182 bgcolor=#E9E9E9
| 408182 ||  || — || April 6, 2005 || Catalina || CSS || — || align=right | 1.2 km || 
|-id=183 bgcolor=#fefefe
| 408183 ||  || — || March 5, 2006 || Kitt Peak || Spacewatch || — || align=right data-sort-value="0.82" | 820 m || 
|-id=184 bgcolor=#E9E9E9
| 408184 ||  || — || September 5, 2010 || Mount Lemmon || Mount Lemmon Survey || EUN || align=right | 1.2 km || 
|-id=185 bgcolor=#d6d6d6
| 408185 ||  || — || September 26, 2005 || Kitt Peak || Spacewatch || — || align=right | 2.8 km || 
|-id=186 bgcolor=#fefefe
| 408186 ||  || — || December 29, 2008 || Kitt Peak || Spacewatch || — || align=right data-sort-value="0.82" | 820 m || 
|-id=187 bgcolor=#fefefe
| 408187 ||  || — || March 23, 2006 || Kitt Peak || Spacewatch || MAS || align=right data-sort-value="0.75" | 750 m || 
|-id=188 bgcolor=#fefefe
| 408188 ||  || — || December 21, 2008 || Kitt Peak || Spacewatch || — || align=right data-sort-value="0.84" | 840 m || 
|-id=189 bgcolor=#fefefe
| 408189 ||  || — || October 5, 2004 || Kitt Peak || Spacewatch || — || align=right data-sort-value="0.85" | 850 m || 
|-id=190 bgcolor=#fefefe
| 408190 ||  || — || September 16, 2003 || Kitt Peak || Spacewatch || NYS || align=right data-sort-value="0.66" | 660 m || 
|-id=191 bgcolor=#E9E9E9
| 408191 ||  || — || November 15, 2007 || Catalina || CSS || — || align=right | 1.2 km || 
|-id=192 bgcolor=#fefefe
| 408192 ||  || — || May 26, 2003 || Kitt Peak || Spacewatch || — || align=right | 1.7 km || 
|-id=193 bgcolor=#E9E9E9
| 408193 ||  || — || August 27, 2006 || Kitt Peak || Spacewatch || — || align=right | 1.5 km || 
|-id=194 bgcolor=#E9E9E9
| 408194 ||  || — || May 4, 2005 || Kitt Peak || Spacewatch || — || align=right data-sort-value="0.86" | 860 m || 
|-id=195 bgcolor=#fefefe
| 408195 ||  || — || December 29, 2008 || Mount Lemmon || Mount Lemmon Survey || — || align=right data-sort-value="0.81" | 810 m || 
|-id=196 bgcolor=#d6d6d6
| 408196 ||  || — || May 28, 2008 || Kitt Peak || Spacewatch || — || align=right | 3.3 km || 
|-id=197 bgcolor=#E9E9E9
| 408197 ||  || — || September 29, 2011 || Kitt Peak || Spacewatch || — || align=right | 1.8 km || 
|-id=198 bgcolor=#fefefe
| 408198 ||  || — || September 29, 2011 || Mount Lemmon || Mount Lemmon Survey || — || align=right data-sort-value="0.77" | 770 m || 
|-id=199 bgcolor=#E9E9E9
| 408199 ||  || — || November 14, 2007 || Mount Lemmon || Mount Lemmon Survey || — || align=right | 1.3 km || 
|-id=200 bgcolor=#fefefe
| 408200 ||  || — || November 7, 2008 || Mount Lemmon || Mount Lemmon Survey || — || align=right | 1.0 km || 
|}

408201–408300 

|-bgcolor=#fefefe
| 408201 ||  || — || September 23, 2011 || Kitt Peak || Spacewatch || — || align=right data-sort-value="0.85" | 850 m || 
|-id=202 bgcolor=#fefefe
| 408202 ||  || — || August 21, 2004 || Catalina || CSS || — || align=right data-sort-value="0.96" | 960 m || 
|-id=203 bgcolor=#E9E9E9
| 408203 ||  || — || April 7, 2005 || Mount Lemmon || Mount Lemmon Survey || — || align=right data-sort-value="0.94" | 940 m || 
|-id=204 bgcolor=#d6d6d6
| 408204 ||  || — || April 14, 2008 || Mount Lemmon || Mount Lemmon Survey || — || align=right | 2.4 km || 
|-id=205 bgcolor=#fefefe
| 408205 ||  || — || February 14, 2002 || Kitt Peak || Spacewatch || — || align=right data-sort-value="0.78" | 780 m || 
|-id=206 bgcolor=#fefefe
| 408206 ||  || — || September 30, 2005 || Mount Lemmon || Mount Lemmon Survey || — || align=right data-sort-value="0.53" | 530 m || 
|-id=207 bgcolor=#d6d6d6
| 408207 ||  || — || January 14, 2002 || Kitt Peak || Spacewatch || — || align=right | 2.6 km || 
|-id=208 bgcolor=#fefefe
| 408208 ||  || — || April 8, 2010 || Kitt Peak || Spacewatch || — || align=right data-sort-value="0.64" | 640 m || 
|-id=209 bgcolor=#fefefe
| 408209 ||  || — || October 8, 2007 || Kitt Peak || Spacewatch || — || align=right data-sort-value="0.70" | 700 m || 
|-id=210 bgcolor=#fefefe
| 408210 ||  || — || September 23, 2008 || Kitt Peak || Spacewatch || — || align=right data-sort-value="0.56" | 560 m || 
|-id=211 bgcolor=#fefefe
| 408211 ||  || — || March 24, 2006 || Mount Lemmon || Mount Lemmon Survey || — || align=right data-sort-value="0.64" | 640 m || 
|-id=212 bgcolor=#fefefe
| 408212 ||  || — || October 9, 2004 || Kitt Peak || Spacewatch || — || align=right data-sort-value="0.75" | 750 m || 
|-id=213 bgcolor=#fefefe
| 408213 ||  || — || April 2, 2006 || Mount Lemmon || Mount Lemmon Survey || — || align=right data-sort-value="0.86" | 860 m || 
|-id=214 bgcolor=#E9E9E9
| 408214 ||  || — || May 3, 2005 || Kitt Peak || Spacewatch || EUN || align=right | 1.0 km || 
|-id=215 bgcolor=#fefefe
| 408215 ||  || — || April 2, 2006 || Kitt Peak || Spacewatch || — || align=right data-sort-value="0.74" | 740 m || 
|-id=216 bgcolor=#fefefe
| 408216 ||  || — || September 7, 2004 || Kitt Peak || Spacewatch || — || align=right data-sort-value="0.69" | 690 m || 
|-id=217 bgcolor=#fefefe
| 408217 ||  || — || April 2, 2006 || Kitt Peak || Spacewatch || — || align=right data-sort-value="0.80" | 800 m || 
|-id=218 bgcolor=#fefefe
| 408218 ||  || — || August 29, 2006 || Kitt Peak || Spacewatch || H || align=right data-sort-value="0.49" | 490 m || 
|-id=219 bgcolor=#E9E9E9
| 408219 ||  || — || September 25, 2006 || Kitt Peak || Spacewatch || — || align=right | 1.7 km || 
|-id=220 bgcolor=#fefefe
| 408220 ||  || — || April 9, 2010 || Kitt Peak || Spacewatch || — || align=right data-sort-value="0.79" | 790 m || 
|-id=221 bgcolor=#E9E9E9
| 408221 ||  || — || April 20, 2009 || Kitt Peak || Spacewatch || ADE || align=right | 1.6 km || 
|-id=222 bgcolor=#E9E9E9
| 408222 ||  || — || March 26, 2009 || Mount Lemmon || Mount Lemmon Survey || ADE || align=right | 1.9 km || 
|-id=223 bgcolor=#E9E9E9
| 408223 ||  || — || March 3, 2005 || Kitt Peak || Spacewatch || — || align=right data-sort-value="0.86" | 860 m || 
|-id=224 bgcolor=#fefefe
| 408224 ||  || — || October 18, 2007 || Mount Lemmon || Mount Lemmon Survey || MAS || align=right data-sort-value="0.93" | 930 m || 
|-id=225 bgcolor=#fefefe
| 408225 ||  || — || November 1, 2011 || Catalina || CSS || — || align=right | 1.2 km || 
|-id=226 bgcolor=#E9E9E9
| 408226 ||  || — || September 5, 2010 || Mount Lemmon || Mount Lemmon Survey || — || align=right | 1.6 km || 
|-id=227 bgcolor=#fefefe
| 408227 ||  || — || May 3, 2006 || Mount Lemmon || Mount Lemmon Survey || MAS || align=right data-sort-value="0.67" | 670 m || 
|-id=228 bgcolor=#fefefe
| 408228 ||  || — || September 21, 2001 || Kitt Peak || Spacewatch || — || align=right data-sort-value="0.55" | 550 m || 
|-id=229 bgcolor=#d6d6d6
| 408229 ||  || — || April 25, 2008 || Kitt Peak || Spacewatch || — || align=right | 2.6 km || 
|-id=230 bgcolor=#fefefe
| 408230 ||  || — || February 20, 2006 || Kitt Peak || Spacewatch || — || align=right data-sort-value="0.64" | 640 m || 
|-id=231 bgcolor=#fefefe
| 408231 ||  || — || March 2, 2006 || Kitt Peak || Spacewatch || — || align=right data-sort-value="0.68" | 680 m || 
|-id=232 bgcolor=#fefefe
| 408232 ||  || — || November 5, 2007 || Mount Lemmon || Mount Lemmon Survey || MAS || align=right data-sort-value="0.74" | 740 m || 
|-id=233 bgcolor=#E9E9E9
| 408233 ||  || — || November 19, 2006 || Kitt Peak || Spacewatch || — || align=right | 1.5 km || 
|-id=234 bgcolor=#fefefe
| 408234 ||  || — || February 3, 2009 || Kitt Peak || Spacewatch || — || align=right data-sort-value="0.86" | 860 m || 
|-id=235 bgcolor=#fefefe
| 408235 ||  || — || November 3, 1991 || Kitt Peak || Spacewatch || — || align=right | 1.2 km || 
|-id=236 bgcolor=#fefefe
| 408236 ||  || — || January 1, 2009 || Kitt Peak || Spacewatch || — || align=right data-sort-value="0.78" | 780 m || 
|-id=237 bgcolor=#fefefe
| 408237 ||  || — || April 30, 2006 || Kitt Peak || Spacewatch || NYS || align=right data-sort-value="0.56" | 560 m || 
|-id=238 bgcolor=#d6d6d6
| 408238 ||  || — || October 4, 1999 || Kitt Peak || Spacewatch || — || align=right | 2.9 km || 
|-id=239 bgcolor=#fefefe
| 408239 ||  || — || February 20, 2006 || Kitt Peak || Spacewatch || — || align=right data-sort-value="0.65" | 650 m || 
|-id=240 bgcolor=#fefefe
| 408240 ||  || — || November 19, 2008 || Kitt Peak || Spacewatch || V || align=right data-sort-value="0.62" | 620 m || 
|-id=241 bgcolor=#E9E9E9
| 408241 ||  || — || April 16, 2004 || Kitt Peak || Spacewatch || — || align=right | 2.9 km || 
|-id=242 bgcolor=#E9E9E9
| 408242 ||  || — || April 7, 2005 || Kitt Peak || Spacewatch || — || align=right data-sort-value="0.70" | 700 m || 
|-id=243 bgcolor=#fefefe
| 408243 ||  || — || March 25, 2006 || Kitt Peak || Spacewatch || V || align=right data-sort-value="0.73" | 730 m || 
|-id=244 bgcolor=#E9E9E9
| 408244 ||  || — || March 23, 2009 || XuYi || PMO NEO || — || align=right | 1.6 km || 
|-id=245 bgcolor=#E9E9E9
| 408245 ||  || — || January 20, 2009 || Mount Lemmon || Mount Lemmon Survey || MAR || align=right data-sort-value="0.99" | 990 m || 
|-id=246 bgcolor=#d6d6d6
| 408246 ||  || — || April 14, 2008 || Mount Lemmon || Mount Lemmon Survey || — || align=right | 2.3 km || 
|-id=247 bgcolor=#E9E9E9
| 408247 ||  || — || May 10, 2005 || Mount Lemmon || Mount Lemmon Survey || — || align=right | 1.0 km || 
|-id=248 bgcolor=#fefefe
| 408248 ||  || — || September 15, 2007 || Mount Lemmon || Mount Lemmon Survey || — || align=right data-sort-value="0.81" | 810 m || 
|-id=249 bgcolor=#fefefe
| 408249 ||  || — || April 25, 2006 || Mount Lemmon || Mount Lemmon Survey || — || align=right data-sort-value="0.94" | 940 m || 
|-id=250 bgcolor=#E9E9E9
| 408250 ||  || — || September 17, 2006 || Catalina || CSS || EUN || align=right | 1.7 km || 
|-id=251 bgcolor=#E9E9E9
| 408251 ||  || — || September 25, 2006 || Mount Lemmon || Mount Lemmon Survey || RAF || align=right | 1.0 km || 
|-id=252 bgcolor=#fefefe
| 408252 ||  || — || April 9, 2010 || Kitt Peak || Spacewatch || — || align=right data-sort-value="0.58" | 580 m || 
|-id=253 bgcolor=#fefefe
| 408253 ||  || — || March 4, 2006 || Mount Lemmon || Mount Lemmon Survey || — || align=right data-sort-value="0.72" | 720 m || 
|-id=254 bgcolor=#fefefe
| 408254 ||  || — || November 10, 2001 || Socorro || LINEAR || H || align=right data-sort-value="0.89" | 890 m || 
|-id=255 bgcolor=#E9E9E9
| 408255 ||  || — || April 22, 2009 || Mount Lemmon || Mount Lemmon Survey || EUN || align=right | 1.3 km || 
|-id=256 bgcolor=#E9E9E9
| 408256 ||  || — || April 30, 2005 || Kitt Peak || Spacewatch || (5) || align=right data-sort-value="0.91" | 910 m || 
|-id=257 bgcolor=#E9E9E9
| 408257 ||  || — || December 21, 2003 || Socorro || LINEAR || EUN || align=right | 1.3 km || 
|-id=258 bgcolor=#E9E9E9
| 408258 ||  || — || May 15, 2009 || Kitt Peak || Spacewatch || — || align=right | 1.8 km || 
|-id=259 bgcolor=#fefefe
| 408259 ||  || — || October 20, 2007 || Mount Lemmon || Mount Lemmon Survey || V || align=right data-sort-value="0.79" | 790 m || 
|-id=260 bgcolor=#fefefe
| 408260 ||  || — || March 26, 2006 || Kitt Peak || Spacewatch || NYS || align=right data-sort-value="0.67" | 670 m || 
|-id=261 bgcolor=#fefefe
| 408261 ||  || — || April 9, 2006 || Kitt Peak || Spacewatch || — || align=right data-sort-value="0.68" | 680 m || 
|-id=262 bgcolor=#E9E9E9
| 408262 ||  || — || March 28, 2004 || Kitt Peak || Spacewatch || MRX || align=right data-sort-value="0.96" | 960 m || 
|-id=263 bgcolor=#fefefe
| 408263 ||  || — || January 13, 1996 || Kitt Peak || Spacewatch || — || align=right data-sort-value="0.87" | 870 m || 
|-id=264 bgcolor=#E9E9E9
| 408264 ||  || — || April 17, 1996 || Kitt Peak || Spacewatch || MIS || align=right | 2.3 km || 
|-id=265 bgcolor=#fefefe
| 408265 ||  || — || August 8, 2010 || Siding Spring || SSS || — || align=right | 1.5 km || 
|-id=266 bgcolor=#E9E9E9
| 408266 ||  || — || April 17, 2004 || Socorro || LINEAR || — || align=right | 2.1 km || 
|-id=267 bgcolor=#E9E9E9
| 408267 ||  || — || April 24, 2004 || Kitt Peak || Spacewatch || — || align=right | 2.3 km || 
|-id=268 bgcolor=#E9E9E9
| 408268 ||  || — || March 21, 2009 || Kitt Peak || Spacewatch || — || align=right data-sort-value="0.89" | 890 m || 
|-id=269 bgcolor=#fefefe
| 408269 ||  || — || April 9, 2005 || Mount Lemmon || Mount Lemmon Survey || — || align=right | 1.2 km || 
|-id=270 bgcolor=#fefefe
| 408270 ||  || — || September 15, 2007 || Mount Lemmon || Mount Lemmon Survey || — || align=right data-sort-value="0.70" | 700 m || 
|-id=271 bgcolor=#E9E9E9
| 408271 ||  || — || May 17, 2009 || Mount Lemmon || Mount Lemmon Survey || EUN || align=right | 1.2 km || 
|-id=272 bgcolor=#fefefe
| 408272 ||  || — || April 9, 2006 || Kitt Peak || Spacewatch || — || align=right data-sort-value="0.85" | 850 m || 
|-id=273 bgcolor=#fefefe
| 408273 ||  || — || September 10, 2007 || Mount Lemmon || Mount Lemmon Survey || — || align=right data-sort-value="0.82" | 820 m || 
|-id=274 bgcolor=#fefefe
| 408274 ||  || — || May 6, 2006 || Mount Lemmon || Mount Lemmon Survey || — || align=right | 1.4 km || 
|-id=275 bgcolor=#d6d6d6
| 408275 ||  || — || August 26, 2009 || Catalina || CSS || — || align=right | 3.0 km || 
|-id=276 bgcolor=#fefefe
| 408276 ||  || — || May 6, 2006 || Mount Lemmon || Mount Lemmon Survey || — || align=right | 1.6 km || 
|-id=277 bgcolor=#fefefe
| 408277 ||  || — || April 25, 2003 || Kitt Peak || Spacewatch || — || align=right data-sort-value="0.86" | 860 m || 
|-id=278 bgcolor=#fefefe
| 408278 ||  || — || January 23, 2006 || Kitt Peak || Spacewatch || — || align=right data-sort-value="0.69" | 690 m || 
|-id=279 bgcolor=#E9E9E9
| 408279 ||  || — || January 18, 2004 || Catalina || CSS || — || align=right | 2.0 km || 
|-id=280 bgcolor=#E9E9E9
| 408280 ||  || — || April 4, 2005 || Catalina || CSS || — || align=right | 1.3 km || 
|-id=281 bgcolor=#d6d6d6
| 408281 ||  || — || April 7, 2008 || Kitt Peak || Spacewatch || — || align=right | 3.2 km || 
|-id=282 bgcolor=#fefefe
| 408282 ||  || — || September 24, 2011 || Kitt Peak || Spacewatch || V || align=right data-sort-value="0.53" | 530 m || 
|-id=283 bgcolor=#fefefe
| 408283 ||  || — || February 1, 2009 || Kitt Peak || Spacewatch || MAS || align=right data-sort-value="0.83" | 830 m || 
|-id=284 bgcolor=#E9E9E9
| 408284 ||  || — || March 3, 2008 || Mount Lemmon || Mount Lemmon Survey || — || align=right | 1.9 km || 
|-id=285 bgcolor=#E9E9E9
| 408285 ||  || — || March 17, 2004 || Kitt Peak || Spacewatch || — || align=right | 2.3 km || 
|-id=286 bgcolor=#E9E9E9
| 408286 ||  || — || April 12, 2005 || Kitt Peak || Spacewatch || — || align=right data-sort-value="0.90" | 900 m || 
|-id=287 bgcolor=#fefefe
| 408287 ||  || — || January 23, 2006 || Mount Lemmon || Mount Lemmon Survey || — || align=right data-sort-value="0.84" | 840 m || 
|-id=288 bgcolor=#fefefe
| 408288 ||  || — || May 6, 2006 || Mount Lemmon || Mount Lemmon Survey || NYS || align=right | 1.9 km || 
|-id=289 bgcolor=#E9E9E9
| 408289 ||  || — || October 2, 2010 || Kitt Peak || Spacewatch || — || align=right | 1.8 km || 
|-id=290 bgcolor=#d6d6d6
| 408290 ||  || — || December 27, 2006 || Kitt Peak || Spacewatch || — || align=right | 2.5 km || 
|-id=291 bgcolor=#fefefe
| 408291 ||  || — || October 10, 2007 || Mount Lemmon || Mount Lemmon Survey || — || align=right | 1.9 km || 
|-id=292 bgcolor=#fefefe
| 408292 ||  || — || December 25, 2005 || Kitt Peak || Spacewatch || — || align=right data-sort-value="0.60" | 600 m || 
|-id=293 bgcolor=#E9E9E9
| 408293 ||  || — || February 28, 2008 || Mount Lemmon || Mount Lemmon Survey || — || align=right | 1.8 km || 
|-id=294 bgcolor=#fefefe
| 408294 ||  || — || December 31, 2008 || Kitt Peak || Spacewatch || — || align=right data-sort-value="0.80" | 800 m || 
|-id=295 bgcolor=#E9E9E9
| 408295 ||  || — || March 2, 2009 || Mount Lemmon || Mount Lemmon Survey || — || align=right | 2.1 km || 
|-id=296 bgcolor=#fefefe
| 408296 ||  || — || January 19, 2005 || Kitt Peak || Spacewatch || MAS || align=right data-sort-value="0.81" | 810 m || 
|-id=297 bgcolor=#d6d6d6
| 408297 ||  || — || February 17, 2007 || Mount Lemmon || Mount Lemmon Survey || — || align=right | 2.8 km || 
|-id=298 bgcolor=#d6d6d6
| 408298 ||  || — || January 28, 2007 || Mount Lemmon || Mount Lemmon Survey || THM || align=right | 2.7 km || 
|-id=299 bgcolor=#fefefe
| 408299 ||  || — || October 30, 2007 || Mount Lemmon || Mount Lemmon Survey || — || align=right data-sort-value="0.73" | 730 m || 
|-id=300 bgcolor=#E9E9E9
| 408300 ||  || — || November 18, 2007 || Kitt Peak || Spacewatch || — || align=right | 1.0 km || 
|}

408301–408400 

|-bgcolor=#fefefe
| 408301 ||  || — || October 20, 2011 || Kitt Peak || Spacewatch || — || align=right data-sort-value="0.86" | 860 m || 
|-id=302 bgcolor=#d6d6d6
| 408302 ||  || — || October 12, 2005 || Kitt Peak || Spacewatch || — || align=right | 3.1 km || 
|-id=303 bgcolor=#fefefe
| 408303 ||  || — || February 25, 2006 || Mount Lemmon || Mount Lemmon Survey || — || align=right data-sort-value="0.80" | 800 m || 
|-id=304 bgcolor=#fefefe
| 408304 ||  || — || March 5, 2006 || Kitt Peak || Spacewatch || — || align=right data-sort-value="0.77" | 770 m || 
|-id=305 bgcolor=#E9E9E9
| 408305 ||  || — || January 19, 2008 || Mount Lemmon || Mount Lemmon Survey || EUN || align=right | 1.3 km || 
|-id=306 bgcolor=#fefefe
| 408306 ||  || — || October 22, 2003 || Kitt Peak || Spacewatch || — || align=right | 1.1 km || 
|-id=307 bgcolor=#E9E9E9
| 408307 ||  || — || March 13, 2005 || Kitt Peak || Spacewatch || — || align=right data-sort-value="0.86" | 860 m || 
|-id=308 bgcolor=#E9E9E9
| 408308 ||  || — || February 18, 2013 || Mount Lemmon || Mount Lemmon Survey || — || align=right | 1.4 km || 
|-id=309 bgcolor=#E9E9E9
| 408309 ||  || — || June 14, 2005 || Kitt Peak || Spacewatch || — || align=right | 1.3 km || 
|-id=310 bgcolor=#E9E9E9
| 408310 ||  || — || May 4, 2009 || Mount Lemmon || Mount Lemmon Survey || — || align=right | 1.5 km || 
|-id=311 bgcolor=#fefefe
| 408311 ||  || — || December 30, 2008 || Kitt Peak || Spacewatch || (2076) || align=right data-sort-value="0.83" | 830 m || 
|-id=312 bgcolor=#E9E9E9
| 408312 ||  || — || October 24, 2011 || Kitt Peak || Spacewatch || EUN || align=right | 1.1 km || 
|-id=313 bgcolor=#fefefe
| 408313 ||  || — || December 1, 2008 || Mount Lemmon || Mount Lemmon Survey || — || align=right | 1.1 km || 
|-id=314 bgcolor=#E9E9E9
| 408314 ||  || — || March 9, 2005 || Mount Lemmon || Mount Lemmon Survey || — || align=right data-sort-value="0.98" | 980 m || 
|-id=315 bgcolor=#fefefe
| 408315 ||  || — || October 19, 2011 || Kitt Peak || Spacewatch || — || align=right data-sort-value="0.70" | 700 m || 
|-id=316 bgcolor=#E9E9E9
| 408316 ||  || — || January 15, 2004 || Kitt Peak || Spacewatch || — || align=right | 1.7 km || 
|-id=317 bgcolor=#d6d6d6
| 408317 ||  || — || January 18, 2012 || Mount Lemmon || Mount Lemmon Survey || THMcritical || align=right | 2.1 km || 
|-id=318 bgcolor=#fefefe
| 408318 ||  || — || April 5, 2003 || Kitt Peak || Spacewatch || — || align=right data-sort-value="0.70" | 700 m || 
|-id=319 bgcolor=#fefefe
| 408319 ||  || — || February 10, 2002 || Socorro || LINEAR || — || align=right data-sort-value="0.65" | 650 m || 
|-id=320 bgcolor=#E9E9E9
| 408320 ||  || — || November 19, 2006 || Kitt Peak || Spacewatch || EUN || align=right | 1.3 km || 
|-id=321 bgcolor=#d6d6d6
| 408321 ||  || — || September 20, 1995 || Kitt Peak || Spacewatch || — || align=right | 2.4 km || 
|-id=322 bgcolor=#d6d6d6
| 408322 ||  || — || February 9, 2007 || Kitt Peak || Spacewatch || — || align=right | 3.2 km || 
|-id=323 bgcolor=#fefefe
| 408323 ||  || — || April 20, 1998 || Kitt Peak || Spacewatch || — || align=right data-sort-value="0.85" | 850 m || 
|-id=324 bgcolor=#E9E9E9
| 408324 ||  || — || January 13, 2008 || Kitt Peak || Spacewatch || — || align=right | 1.2 km || 
|-id=325 bgcolor=#E9E9E9
| 408325 ||  || — || October 23, 2001 || Socorro || LINEAR || — || align=right | 2.8 km || 
|-id=326 bgcolor=#E9E9E9
| 408326 ||  || — || October 2, 2006 || Mount Lemmon || Mount Lemmon Survey || — || align=right | 1.6 km || 
|-id=327 bgcolor=#fefefe
| 408327 ||  || — || March 4, 2005 || Mount Lemmon || Mount Lemmon Survey || NYS || align=right data-sort-value="0.64" | 640 m || 
|-id=328 bgcolor=#fefefe
| 408328 ||  || — || November 19, 2008 || Kitt Peak || Spacewatch || — || align=right data-sort-value="0.65" | 650 m || 
|-id=329 bgcolor=#fefefe
| 408329 ||  || — || April 30, 2006 || Kitt Peak || Spacewatch || — || align=right data-sort-value="0.64" | 640 m || 
|-id=330 bgcolor=#E9E9E9
| 408330 ||  || — || March 22, 2004 || Anderson Mesa || LONEOS || — || align=right | 2.1 km || 
|-id=331 bgcolor=#E9E9E9
| 408331 ||  || — || December 28, 2003 || Kitt Peak || Spacewatch || ADE || align=right | 2.5 km || 
|-id=332 bgcolor=#E9E9E9
| 408332 ||  || — || April 17, 2009 || Kitt Peak || Spacewatch || — || align=right | 3.2 km || 
|-id=333 bgcolor=#d6d6d6
| 408333 ||  || — || December 14, 2010 || Mount Lemmon || Mount Lemmon Survey || — || align=right | 3.1 km || 
|-id=334 bgcolor=#E9E9E9
| 408334 ||  || — || February 6, 2008 || Catalina || CSS || GEF || align=right | 1.2 km || 
|-id=335 bgcolor=#E9E9E9
| 408335 ||  || — || December 12, 2006 || Kitt Peak || Spacewatch || — || align=right | 2.9 km || 
|-id=336 bgcolor=#fefefe
| 408336 ||  || — || February 26, 2009 || Catalina || CSS || — || align=right data-sort-value="0.66" | 660 m || 
|-id=337 bgcolor=#fefefe
| 408337 ||  || — || April 16, 1999 || Kitt Peak || Spacewatch || — || align=right data-sort-value="0.63" | 630 m || 
|-id=338 bgcolor=#E9E9E9
| 408338 ||  || — || December 30, 2007 || Kitt Peak || Spacewatch || — || align=right | 1.4 km || 
|-id=339 bgcolor=#d6d6d6
| 408339 ||  || — || May 10, 1996 || Kitt Peak || Spacewatch || THB || align=right | 3.5 km || 
|-id=340 bgcolor=#fefefe
| 408340 ||  || — || April 13, 2002 || Kitt Peak || Spacewatch || V || align=right data-sort-value="0.72" | 720 m || 
|-id=341 bgcolor=#d6d6d6
| 408341 ||  || — || April 12, 2008 || Kitt Peak || Spacewatch || — || align=right | 2.8 km || 
|-id=342 bgcolor=#fefefe
| 408342 ||  || — || March 20, 1998 || Kitt Peak || Spacewatch || MAS || align=right data-sort-value="0.64" | 640 m || 
|-id=343 bgcolor=#fefefe
| 408343 ||  || — || September 20, 2011 || Mount Lemmon || Mount Lemmon Survey || — || align=right data-sort-value="0.84" | 840 m || 
|-id=344 bgcolor=#E9E9E9
| 408344 ||  || — || September 15, 2006 || Kitt Peak || Spacewatch || HNS || align=right | 1.4 km || 
|-id=345 bgcolor=#E9E9E9
| 408345 ||  || — || October 1, 2010 || Mount Lemmon || Mount Lemmon Survey || — || align=right | 1.6 km || 
|-id=346 bgcolor=#fefefe
| 408346 ||  || — || October 30, 2011 || Kitt Peak || Spacewatch || — || align=right data-sort-value="0.92" | 920 m || 
|-id=347 bgcolor=#d6d6d6
| 408347 ||  || — || October 14, 2010 || Mount Lemmon || Mount Lemmon Survey || EOS || align=right | 2.3 km || 
|-id=348 bgcolor=#E9E9E9
| 408348 ||  || — || January 30, 2008 || Kitt Peak || Spacewatch || — || align=right | 1.5 km || 
|-id=349 bgcolor=#fefefe
| 408349 ||  || — || March 3, 2005 || Catalina || CSS || — || align=right | 1.0 km || 
|-id=350 bgcolor=#fefefe
| 408350 ||  || — || April 25, 2003 || Kitt Peak || Spacewatch || — || align=right | 1.0 km || 
|-id=351 bgcolor=#E9E9E9
| 408351 ||  || — || March 31, 2013 || Mount Lemmon || Mount Lemmon Survey || — || align=right | 2.0 km || 
|-id=352 bgcolor=#d6d6d6
| 408352 ||  || — || July 2, 2003 || Socorro || LINEAR || — || align=right | 3.6 km || 
|-id=353 bgcolor=#E9E9E9
| 408353 ||  || — || March 14, 2004 || Kitt Peak || Spacewatch || — || align=right | 1.5 km || 
|-id=354 bgcolor=#d6d6d6
| 408354 ||  || — || March 31, 2008 || Catalina || CSS || BRA || align=right | 2.0 km || 
|-id=355 bgcolor=#fefefe
| 408355 ||  || — || April 3, 2003 || Anderson Mesa || LONEOS || — || align=right data-sort-value="0.91" | 910 m || 
|-id=356 bgcolor=#fefefe
| 408356 ||  || — || October 10, 2007 || Kitt Peak || Spacewatch || — || align=right data-sort-value="0.96" | 960 m || 
|-id=357 bgcolor=#fefefe
| 408357 ||  || — || December 26, 2005 || Kitt Peak || Spacewatch || — || align=right data-sort-value="0.86" | 860 m || 
|-id=358 bgcolor=#fefefe
| 408358 ||  || — || June 26, 2006 || Siding Spring || SSS || — || align=right | 1.9 km || 
|-id=359 bgcolor=#E9E9E9
| 408359 ||  || — || January 20, 2008 || Mount Lemmon || Mount Lemmon Survey || — || align=right | 3.1 km || 
|-id=360 bgcolor=#d6d6d6
| 408360 ||  || — || October 1, 2009 || Mount Lemmon || Mount Lemmon Survey || — || align=right | 3.0 km || 
|-id=361 bgcolor=#d6d6d6
| 408361 ||  || — || October 15, 2009 || Mount Lemmon || Mount Lemmon Survey || — || align=right | 2.8 km || 
|-id=362 bgcolor=#E9E9E9
| 408362 ||  || — || January 11, 2008 || Kitt Peak || Spacewatch || — || align=right | 1.7 km || 
|-id=363 bgcolor=#fefefe
| 408363 ||  || — || September 4, 2010 || Mount Lemmon || Mount Lemmon Survey || — || align=right | 1.1 km || 
|-id=364 bgcolor=#E9E9E9
| 408364 ||  || — || September 18, 2010 || Mount Lemmon || Mount Lemmon Survey || — || align=right | 1.5 km || 
|-id=365 bgcolor=#E9E9E9
| 408365 ||  || — || January 15, 1999 || Kitt Peak || Spacewatch || — || align=right | 2.1 km || 
|-id=366 bgcolor=#E9E9E9
| 408366 ||  || — || September 10, 2010 || Kitt Peak || Spacewatch || — || align=right | 1.0 km || 
|-id=367 bgcolor=#fefefe
| 408367 ||  || — || January 9, 2006 || Kitt Peak || Spacewatch || — || align=right data-sort-value="0.68" | 680 m || 
|-id=368 bgcolor=#E9E9E9
| 408368 ||  || — || September 19, 2010 || Kitt Peak || Spacewatch || — || align=right | 2.2 km || 
|-id=369 bgcolor=#fefefe
| 408369 ||  || — || February 20, 2009 || Kitt Peak || Spacewatch || NYS || align=right data-sort-value="0.77" | 770 m || 
|-id=370 bgcolor=#fefefe
| 408370 ||  || — || January 1, 2009 || Kitt Peak || Spacewatch || — || align=right data-sort-value="0.78" | 780 m || 
|-id=371 bgcolor=#E9E9E9
| 408371 ||  || — || April 13, 1996 || Kitt Peak || Spacewatch || — || align=right | 1.8 km || 
|-id=372 bgcolor=#d6d6d6
| 408372 ||  || — || October 17, 2010 || Mount Lemmon || Mount Lemmon Survey || — || align=right | 2.9 km || 
|-id=373 bgcolor=#d6d6d6
| 408373 ||  || — || September 17, 2009 || Mount Lemmon || Mount Lemmon Survey || — || align=right | 3.0 km || 
|-id=374 bgcolor=#E9E9E9
| 408374 ||  || — || April 18, 2009 || Kitt Peak || Spacewatch || — || align=right | 1.2 km || 
|-id=375 bgcolor=#E9E9E9
| 408375 ||  || — || May 11, 2004 || Anderson Mesa || LONEOS || — || align=right | 2.8 km || 
|-id=376 bgcolor=#fefefe
| 408376 ||  || — || September 24, 2007 || Kitt Peak || Spacewatch || V || align=right data-sort-value="0.62" | 620 m || 
|-id=377 bgcolor=#E9E9E9
| 408377 ||  || — || May 31, 2000 || Kitt Peak || Spacewatch || — || align=right | 2.0 km || 
|-id=378 bgcolor=#E9E9E9
| 408378 ||  || — || April 14, 2004 || Kitt Peak || Spacewatch || — || align=right | 2.4 km || 
|-id=379 bgcolor=#E9E9E9
| 408379 ||  || — || October 17, 2006 || Catalina || CSS || HNS || align=right | 1.7 km || 
|-id=380 bgcolor=#E9E9E9
| 408380 ||  || — || April 18, 1996 || Kitt Peak || Spacewatch || — || align=right | 1.6 km || 
|-id=381 bgcolor=#d6d6d6
| 408381 ||  || — || January 26, 2012 || Mount Lemmon || Mount Lemmon Survey || LIX || align=right | 4.1 km || 
|-id=382 bgcolor=#E9E9E9
| 408382 ||  || — || April 10, 2005 || Mount Lemmon || Mount Lemmon Survey || — || align=right data-sort-value="0.89" | 890 m || 
|-id=383 bgcolor=#d6d6d6
| 408383 ||  || — || September 23, 2009 || Mount Lemmon || Mount Lemmon Survey || — || align=right | 3.5 km || 
|-id=384 bgcolor=#fefefe
| 408384 ||  || — || October 11, 1994 || Kitt Peak || Spacewatch || — || align=right data-sort-value="0.85" | 850 m || 
|-id=385 bgcolor=#E9E9E9
| 408385 ||  || — || March 22, 2001 || Kitt Peak || Spacewatch || — || align=right | 1.2 km || 
|-id=386 bgcolor=#E9E9E9
| 408386 ||  || — || February 7, 2008 || Mount Lemmon || Mount Lemmon Survey || MRX || align=right | 1.1 km || 
|-id=387 bgcolor=#fefefe
| 408387 ||  || — || February 6, 2006 || Mount Lemmon || Mount Lemmon Survey || — || align=right data-sort-value="0.80" | 800 m || 
|-id=388 bgcolor=#fefefe
| 408388 ||  || — || March 23, 2006 || Kitt Peak || Spacewatch || — || align=right data-sort-value="0.94" | 940 m || 
|-id=389 bgcolor=#E9E9E9
| 408389 ||  || — || December 22, 2003 || Kitt Peak || Spacewatch || — || align=right | 1.9 km || 
|-id=390 bgcolor=#fefefe
| 408390 ||  || — || September 10, 2007 || Kitt Peak || Spacewatch || — || align=right data-sort-value="0.75" | 750 m || 
|-id=391 bgcolor=#fefefe
| 408391 ||  || — || October 26, 2008 || Kitt Peak || Spacewatch || — || align=right data-sort-value="0.75" | 750 m || 
|-id=392 bgcolor=#E9E9E9
| 408392 ||  || — || September 25, 2006 || Kitt Peak || Spacewatch || — || align=right data-sort-value="0.95" | 950 m || 
|-id=393 bgcolor=#fefefe
| 408393 ||  || — || December 17, 2001 || Socorro || LINEAR || — || align=right data-sort-value="0.93" | 930 m || 
|-id=394 bgcolor=#E9E9E9
| 408394 ||  || — || June 8, 2005 || Siding Spring || SSS || EUN || align=right | 1.7 km || 
|-id=395 bgcolor=#d6d6d6
| 408395 ||  || — || April 30, 2008 || Mount Lemmon || Mount Lemmon Survey || — || align=right | 2.5 km || 
|-id=396 bgcolor=#d6d6d6
| 408396 ||  || — || September 16, 2009 || Catalina || CSS || — || align=right | 4.6 km || 
|-id=397 bgcolor=#E9E9E9
| 408397 ||  || — || December 4, 2007 || Mount Lemmon || Mount Lemmon Survey || — || align=right | 1.6 km || 
|-id=398 bgcolor=#fefefe
| 408398 ||  || — || December 11, 2004 || Kitt Peak || Spacewatch || (5026) || align=right data-sort-value="0.91" | 910 m || 
|-id=399 bgcolor=#E9E9E9
| 408399 ||  || — || December 16, 2007 || Mount Lemmon || Mount Lemmon Survey || — || align=right | 1.3 km || 
|-id=400 bgcolor=#fefefe
| 408400 ||  || — || November 18, 2011 || Kitt Peak || Spacewatch || V || align=right data-sort-value="0.87" | 870 m || 
|}

408401–408500 

|-bgcolor=#E9E9E9
| 408401 ||  || — || April 14, 2004 || Anderson Mesa || LONEOS || — || align=right | 3.0 km || 
|-id=402 bgcolor=#fefefe
| 408402 ||  || — || October 9, 2007 || Mount Lemmon || Mount Lemmon Survey || V || align=right data-sort-value="0.67" | 670 m || 
|-id=403 bgcolor=#E9E9E9
| 408403 ||  || — || September 17, 2006 || Kitt Peak || Spacewatch || EUN || align=right | 1.4 km || 
|-id=404 bgcolor=#d6d6d6
| 408404 ||  || — || January 28, 2007 || Mount Lemmon || Mount Lemmon Survey || — || align=right | 2.8 km || 
|-id=405 bgcolor=#E9E9E9
| 408405 ||  || — || April 13, 2004 || Kitt Peak || Spacewatch || — || align=right | 1.5 km || 
|-id=406 bgcolor=#fefefe
| 408406 ||  || — || December 31, 2008 || Catalina || CSS || — || align=right data-sort-value="0.72" | 720 m || 
|-id=407 bgcolor=#d6d6d6
| 408407 ||  || — || April 6, 2008 || Kitt Peak || Spacewatch || — || align=right | 2.3 km || 
|-id=408 bgcolor=#E9E9E9
| 408408 ||  || — || April 17, 2005 || Kitt Peak || Spacewatch || — || align=right data-sort-value="0.84" | 840 m || 
|-id=409 bgcolor=#fefefe
| 408409 ||  || — || February 20, 2006 || Mount Lemmon || Mount Lemmon Survey || — || align=right data-sort-value="0.76" | 760 m || 
|-id=410 bgcolor=#E9E9E9
| 408410 ||  || — || April 17, 2005 || Kitt Peak || Spacewatch || — || align=right data-sort-value="0.82" | 820 m || 
|-id=411 bgcolor=#E9E9E9
| 408411 ||  || — || February 9, 2008 || Kitt Peak || Spacewatch || — || align=right | 1.1 km || 
|-id=412 bgcolor=#d6d6d6
| 408412 ||  || — || October 26, 2009 || Kitt Peak || Spacewatch || — || align=right | 3.1 km || 
|-id=413 bgcolor=#E9E9E9
| 408413 ||  || — || June 15, 2005 || Kitt Peak || Spacewatch || — || align=right | 1.2 km || 
|-id=414 bgcolor=#E9E9E9
| 408414 ||  || — || January 19, 2008 || Kitt Peak || Spacewatch || — || align=right | 2.3 km || 
|-id=415 bgcolor=#E9E9E9
| 408415 ||  || — || February 28, 2008 || Mount Lemmon || Mount Lemmon Survey || — || align=right | 1.9 km || 
|-id=416 bgcolor=#d6d6d6
| 408416 ||  || — || April 11, 2008 || Kitt Peak || Spacewatch || — || align=right | 2.8 km || 
|-id=417 bgcolor=#fefefe
| 408417 ||  || — || October 28, 2011 || Mount Lemmon || Mount Lemmon Survey || — || align=right data-sort-value="0.94" | 940 m || 
|-id=418 bgcolor=#fefefe
| 408418 ||  || — || October 8, 2007 || Mount Lemmon || Mount Lemmon Survey || — || align=right data-sort-value="0.85" | 850 m || 
|-id=419 bgcolor=#fefefe
| 408419 ||  || — || September 28, 2000 || Anderson Mesa || LONEOS || H || align=right data-sort-value="0.89" | 890 m || 
|-id=420 bgcolor=#d6d6d6
| 408420 ||  || — || November 22, 2005 || Kitt Peak || Spacewatch || LIX || align=right | 5.4 km || 
|-id=421 bgcolor=#d6d6d6
| 408421 ||  || — || October 16, 2009 || Mount Lemmon || Mount Lemmon Survey || — || align=right | 2.9 km || 
|-id=422 bgcolor=#fefefe
| 408422 ||  || — || May 25, 2006 || Mount Lemmon || Mount Lemmon Survey || — || align=right data-sort-value="0.80" | 800 m || 
|-id=423 bgcolor=#fefefe
| 408423 ||  || — || November 26, 2003 || Kitt Peak || Spacewatch || — || align=right | 2.0 km || 
|-id=424 bgcolor=#E9E9E9
| 408424 ||  || — || October 28, 2010 || Mount Lemmon || Mount Lemmon Survey || — || align=right | 2.6 km || 
|-id=425 bgcolor=#E9E9E9
| 408425 ||  || — || January 4, 2012 || Mount Lemmon || Mount Lemmon Survey || EUN || align=right | 1.6 km || 
|-id=426 bgcolor=#fefefe
| 408426 ||  || — || November 1, 2011 || Mount Lemmon || Mount Lemmon Survey || — || align=right data-sort-value="0.85" | 850 m || 
|-id=427 bgcolor=#d6d6d6
| 408427 ||  || — || March 26, 2007 || Mount Lemmon || Mount Lemmon Survey || — || align=right | 3.2 km || 
|-id=428 bgcolor=#d6d6d6
| 408428 ||  || — || March 15, 2008 || Mount Lemmon || Mount Lemmon Survey || EOS || align=right | 2.1 km || 
|-id=429 bgcolor=#E9E9E9
| 408429 ||  || — || May 16, 2009 || Mount Lemmon || Mount Lemmon Survey || MAR || align=right | 1.2 km || 
|-id=430 bgcolor=#d6d6d6
| 408430 ||  || — || November 1, 2005 || Catalina || CSS || BRA || align=right | 2.0 km || 
|-id=431 bgcolor=#E9E9E9
| 408431 ||  || — || October 9, 2002 || Kitt Peak || Spacewatch || — || align=right | 1.0 km || 
|-id=432 bgcolor=#fefefe
| 408432 ||  || — || September 13, 2007 || Kitt Peak || Spacewatch || — || align=right data-sort-value="0.86" | 860 m || 
|-id=433 bgcolor=#d6d6d6
| 408433 ||  || — || February 19, 2012 || Kitt Peak || Spacewatch || — || align=right | 3.4 km || 
|-id=434 bgcolor=#E9E9E9
| 408434 ||  || — || November 30, 2011 || Catalina || CSS || — || align=right | 2.0 km || 
|-id=435 bgcolor=#d6d6d6
| 408435 ||  || — || October 22, 2005 || Kitt Peak || Spacewatch || — || align=right | 2.4 km || 
|-id=436 bgcolor=#E9E9E9
| 408436 ||  || — || December 17, 2007 || Mount Lemmon || Mount Lemmon Survey || EUN || align=right | 1.7 km || 
|-id=437 bgcolor=#E9E9E9
| 408437 ||  || — || June 18, 2005 || Mount Lemmon || Mount Lemmon Survey || — || align=right | 1.5 km || 
|-id=438 bgcolor=#E9E9E9
| 408438 ||  || — || December 27, 2003 || Kitt Peak || Spacewatch || — || align=right | 1.1 km || 
|-id=439 bgcolor=#E9E9E9
| 408439 ||  || — || November 17, 2006 || Kitt Peak || Spacewatch || (5) || align=right | 1.3 km || 
|-id=440 bgcolor=#d6d6d6
| 408440 ||  || — || May 14, 2008 || Mount Lemmon || Mount Lemmon Survey || — || align=right | 2.8 km || 
|-id=441 bgcolor=#E9E9E9
| 408441 ||  || — || February 11, 2008 || Kitt Peak || Spacewatch || AEO || align=right | 1.1 km || 
|-id=442 bgcolor=#E9E9E9
| 408442 ||  || — || March 21, 2004 || Kitt Peak || Spacewatch || — || align=right | 1.7 km || 
|-id=443 bgcolor=#E9E9E9
| 408443 ||  || — || September 17, 2006 || Kitt Peak || Spacewatch || — || align=right | 1.1 km || 
|-id=444 bgcolor=#d6d6d6
| 408444 ||  || — || April 11, 2007 || Catalina || CSS || — || align=right | 4.8 km || 
|-id=445 bgcolor=#E9E9E9
| 408445 ||  || — || September 27, 2011 || Mount Lemmon || Mount Lemmon Survey || — || align=right | 1.7 km || 
|-id=446 bgcolor=#E9E9E9
| 408446 ||  || — || December 29, 2003 || Anderson Mesa || LONEOS || EUN || align=right | 1.5 km || 
|-id=447 bgcolor=#fefefe
| 408447 ||  || — || November 18, 2007 || Mount Lemmon || Mount Lemmon Survey || — || align=right data-sort-value="0.98" | 980 m || 
|-id=448 bgcolor=#E9E9E9
| 408448 ||  || — || November 30, 2003 || Kitt Peak || Spacewatch || — || align=right data-sort-value="0.90" | 900 m || 
|-id=449 bgcolor=#E9E9E9
| 408449 ||  || — || April 22, 2009 || Kitt Peak || Spacewatch || EUN || align=right | 1.3 km || 
|-id=450 bgcolor=#fefefe
| 408450 ||  || — || April 30, 2006 || Kitt Peak || Spacewatch || — || align=right data-sort-value="0.81" | 810 m || 
|-id=451 bgcolor=#d6d6d6
| 408451 ||  || — || February 16, 2007 || Catalina || CSS || EOS || align=right | 2.5 km || 
|-id=452 bgcolor=#d6d6d6
| 408452 ||  || — || January 16, 2011 || Mount Lemmon || Mount Lemmon Survey || — || align=right | 3.3 km || 
|-id=453 bgcolor=#E9E9E9
| 408453 ||  || — || November 18, 2007 || Mount Lemmon || Mount Lemmon Survey || — || align=right data-sort-value="0.99" | 990 m || 
|-id=454 bgcolor=#E9E9E9
| 408454 ||  || — || January 18, 2012 || Mount Lemmon || Mount Lemmon Survey || — || align=right | 2.2 km || 
|-id=455 bgcolor=#E9E9E9
| 408455 ||  || — || September 27, 2010 || Kitt Peak || Spacewatch || — || align=right | 1.9 km || 
|-id=456 bgcolor=#fefefe
| 408456 ||  || — || September 14, 2007 || Mount Lemmon || Mount Lemmon Survey || — || align=right data-sort-value="0.74" | 740 m || 
|-id=457 bgcolor=#E9E9E9
| 408457 ||  || — || March 9, 2008 || Mount Lemmon || Mount Lemmon Survey || HOF || align=right | 2.4 km || 
|-id=458 bgcolor=#d6d6d6
| 408458 ||  || — || January 30, 2012 || Mount Lemmon || Mount Lemmon Survey || — || align=right | 3.5 km || 
|-id=459 bgcolor=#fefefe
| 408459 ||  || — || January 20, 2009 || Mount Lemmon || Mount Lemmon Survey || V || align=right data-sort-value="0.58" | 580 m || 
|-id=460 bgcolor=#d6d6d6
| 408460 ||  || — || March 9, 2007 || Mount Lemmon || Mount Lemmon Survey || — || align=right | 2.7 km || 
|-id=461 bgcolor=#E9E9E9
| 408461 ||  || — || April 29, 2009 || Mount Lemmon || Mount Lemmon Survey || — || align=right data-sort-value="0.92" | 920 m || 
|-id=462 bgcolor=#E9E9E9
| 408462 ||  || — || March 13, 2008 || Mount Lemmon || Mount Lemmon Survey || AGN || align=right | 1.2 km || 
|-id=463 bgcolor=#d6d6d6
| 408463 ||  || — || September 16, 2010 || Mount Lemmon || Mount Lemmon Survey || — || align=right | 2.1 km || 
|-id=464 bgcolor=#fefefe
| 408464 ||  || — || January 1, 2009 || Kitt Peak || Spacewatch || — || align=right data-sort-value="0.58" | 580 m || 
|-id=465 bgcolor=#E9E9E9
| 408465 ||  || — || February 9, 2008 || Kitt Peak || Spacewatch || — || align=right | 1.8 km || 
|-id=466 bgcolor=#fefefe
| 408466 ||  || — || October 22, 2011 || Kitt Peak || Spacewatch || V || align=right data-sort-value="0.69" | 690 m || 
|-id=467 bgcolor=#fefefe
| 408467 ||  || — || September 10, 2007 || Mount Lemmon || Mount Lemmon Survey || — || align=right data-sort-value="0.60" | 600 m || 
|-id=468 bgcolor=#fefefe
| 408468 ||  || — || April 7, 1999 || Kitt Peak || Spacewatch || — || align=right data-sort-value="0.86" | 860 m || 
|-id=469 bgcolor=#E9E9E9
| 408469 ||  || — || March 28, 2008 || Mount Lemmon || Mount Lemmon Survey || AGN || align=right | 1.1 km || 
|-id=470 bgcolor=#E9E9E9
| 408470 ||  || — || September 25, 2006 || Kitt Peak || Spacewatch || — || align=right data-sort-value="0.78" | 780 m || 
|-id=471 bgcolor=#d6d6d6
| 408471 ||  || — || September 7, 2004 || Kitt Peak || Spacewatch || — || align=right | 2.0 km || 
|-id=472 bgcolor=#E9E9E9
| 408472 ||  || — || September 29, 2005 || Mount Lemmon || Mount Lemmon Survey || — || align=right | 1.9 km || 
|-id=473 bgcolor=#E9E9E9
| 408473 ||  || — || September 7, 2001 || Socorro || LINEAR || — || align=right | 1.7 km || 
|-id=474 bgcolor=#E9E9E9
| 408474 ||  || — || October 29, 2010 || Mount Lemmon || Mount Lemmon Survey || — || align=right | 1.7 km || 
|-id=475 bgcolor=#d6d6d6
| 408475 ||  || — || April 4, 2008 || Kitt Peak || Spacewatch || — || align=right | 2.2 km || 
|-id=476 bgcolor=#E9E9E9
| 408476 ||  || — || February 20, 2009 || Kitt Peak || Spacewatch || MAR || align=right | 1.0 km || 
|-id=477 bgcolor=#E9E9E9
| 408477 ||  || — || September 18, 2010 || Mount Lemmon || Mount Lemmon Survey || NEM || align=right | 1.9 km || 
|-id=478 bgcolor=#E9E9E9
| 408478 ||  || — || February 10, 2008 || Kitt Peak || Spacewatch || — || align=right | 1.8 km || 
|-id=479 bgcolor=#fefefe
| 408479 ||  || — || November 19, 2003 || Kitt Peak || Spacewatch || MAS || align=right data-sort-value="0.71" | 710 m || 
|-id=480 bgcolor=#d6d6d6
| 408480 ||  || — || September 16, 2009 || Mount Lemmon || Mount Lemmon Survey || — || align=right | 1.6 km || 
|-id=481 bgcolor=#fefefe
| 408481 ||  || — || October 27, 2011 || Mount Lemmon || Mount Lemmon Survey || — || align=right data-sort-value="0.80" | 800 m || 
|-id=482 bgcolor=#E9E9E9
| 408482 ||  || — || February 10, 2008 || Kitt Peak || Spacewatch || WIT || align=right data-sort-value="0.87" | 870 m || 
|-id=483 bgcolor=#E9E9E9
| 408483 ||  || — || August 7, 2010 || WISE || WISE || — || align=right | 1.6 km || 
|-id=484 bgcolor=#fefefe
| 408484 ||  || — || March 11, 2005 || Mount Lemmon || Mount Lemmon Survey || V || align=right data-sort-value="0.60" | 600 m || 
|-id=485 bgcolor=#d6d6d6
| 408485 ||  || — || September 16, 2009 || Kitt Peak || Spacewatch || — || align=right | 2.7 km || 
|-id=486 bgcolor=#fefefe
| 408486 ||  || — || November 19, 2008 || Mount Lemmon || Mount Lemmon Survey || BAP || align=right data-sort-value="0.80" | 800 m || 
|-id=487 bgcolor=#E9E9E9
| 408487 ||  || — || March 4, 2008 || Kitt Peak || Spacewatch || — || align=right | 2.0 km || 
|-id=488 bgcolor=#E9E9E9
| 408488 ||  || — || March 15, 2008 || Kitt Peak || Spacewatch || — || align=right | 1.9 km || 
|-id=489 bgcolor=#fefefe
| 408489 ||  || — || January 31, 2006 || Mount Lemmon || Mount Lemmon Survey || — || align=right data-sort-value="0.73" | 730 m || 
|-id=490 bgcolor=#E9E9E9
| 408490 ||  || — || November 17, 2006 || Mount Lemmon || Mount Lemmon Survey || — || align=right | 2.1 km || 
|-id=491 bgcolor=#fefefe
| 408491 ||  || — || April 12, 2005 || Kitt Peak || Spacewatch || — || align=right data-sort-value="0.91" | 910 m || 
|-id=492 bgcolor=#E9E9E9
| 408492 ||  || — || February 28, 2008 || Mount Lemmon || Mount Lemmon Survey || — || align=right | 2.1 km || 
|-id=493 bgcolor=#E9E9E9
| 408493 ||  || — || March 4, 2008 || Mount Lemmon || Mount Lemmon Survey || — || align=right | 2.5 km || 
|-id=494 bgcolor=#d6d6d6
| 408494 ||  || — || November 6, 2005 || Kitt Peak || Spacewatch || — || align=right | 3.1 km || 
|-id=495 bgcolor=#d6d6d6
| 408495 ||  || — || December 25, 2005 || Kitt Peak || Spacewatch || — || align=right | 2.3 km || 
|-id=496 bgcolor=#d6d6d6
| 408496 ||  || — || May 10, 2002 || Kitt Peak || Spacewatch || — || align=right | 3.6 km || 
|-id=497 bgcolor=#d6d6d6
| 408497 ||  || — || March 12, 2007 || Mount Lemmon || Mount Lemmon Survey || — || align=right | 2.7 km || 
|-id=498 bgcolor=#fefefe
| 408498 ||  || — || October 21, 2003 || Anderson Mesa || LONEOS || — || align=right | 1.1 km || 
|-id=499 bgcolor=#E9E9E9
| 408499 ||  || — || January 2, 2012 || Kitt Peak || Spacewatch || — || align=right | 2.0 km || 
|-id=500 bgcolor=#E9E9E9
| 408500 ||  || — || March 5, 2008 || Mount Lemmon || Mount Lemmon Survey || — || align=right | 1.5 km || 
|}

408501–408600 

|-bgcolor=#d6d6d6
| 408501 ||  || — || March 11, 2007 || Kitt Peak || Spacewatch || — || align=right | 2.3 km || 
|-id=502 bgcolor=#d6d6d6
| 408502 ||  || — || October 6, 1999 || Kitt Peak || Spacewatch || EOS || align=right | 1.7 km || 
|-id=503 bgcolor=#E9E9E9
| 408503 ||  || — || March 3, 2000 || Socorro || LINEAR || — || align=right | 1.2 km || 
|-id=504 bgcolor=#E9E9E9
| 408504 ||  || — || November 23, 2006 || Mount Lemmon || Mount Lemmon Survey || — || align=right | 1.6 km || 
|-id=505 bgcolor=#d6d6d6
| 408505 ||  || — || March 9, 2007 || Kitt Peak || Spacewatch || — || align=right | 2.9 km || 
|-id=506 bgcolor=#d6d6d6
| 408506 ||  || — || February 2, 2006 || Mount Lemmon || Mount Lemmon Survey || — || align=right | 3.0 km || 
|-id=507 bgcolor=#E9E9E9
| 408507 ||  || — || March 15, 2004 || Kitt Peak || Spacewatch || — || align=right | 1.3 km || 
|-id=508 bgcolor=#d6d6d6
| 408508 ||  || — || August 19, 2009 || Kitt Peak || Spacewatch || — || align=right | 2.3 km || 
|-id=509 bgcolor=#fefefe
| 408509 ||  || — || February 27, 2006 || Kitt Peak || Spacewatch || — || align=right | 1.1 km || 
|-id=510 bgcolor=#E9E9E9
| 408510 ||  || — || March 25, 2000 || Kitt Peak || Spacewatch || — || align=right | 1.6 km || 
|-id=511 bgcolor=#d6d6d6
| 408511 ||  || — || December 20, 2004 || Mount Lemmon || Mount Lemmon Survey || — || align=right | 4.5 km || 
|-id=512 bgcolor=#d6d6d6
| 408512 ||  || — || July 2, 2008 || Kitt Peak || Spacewatch || — || align=right | 3.0 km || 
|-id=513 bgcolor=#d6d6d6
| 408513 ||  || — || February 23, 2007 || Mount Lemmon || Mount Lemmon Survey || — || align=right | 2.8 km || 
|-id=514 bgcolor=#d6d6d6
| 408514 ||  || — || March 20, 2007 || Mount Lemmon || Mount Lemmon Survey || EOS || align=right | 2.2 km || 
|-id=515 bgcolor=#d6d6d6
| 408515 ||  || — || April 16, 2007 || Catalina || CSS || — || align=right | 4.4 km || 
|-id=516 bgcolor=#E9E9E9
| 408516 ||  || — || June 18, 2005 || Mount Lemmon || Mount Lemmon Survey || — || align=right | 1.7 km || 
|-id=517 bgcolor=#d6d6d6
| 408517 ||  || — || April 30, 2008 || Mount Lemmon || Mount Lemmon Survey || TIR || align=right | 3.4 km || 
|-id=518 bgcolor=#d6d6d6
| 408518 ||  || — || January 27, 2010 || WISE || WISE || EUP || align=right | 4.1 km || 
|-id=519 bgcolor=#d6d6d6
| 408519 ||  || — || March 5, 2006 || Mount Lemmon || Mount Lemmon Survey || — || align=right | 3.6 km || 
|-id=520 bgcolor=#E9E9E9
| 408520 ||  || — || November 17, 2006 || Mount Lemmon || Mount Lemmon Survey || — || align=right | 1.9 km || 
|-id=521 bgcolor=#E9E9E9
| 408521 ||  || — || December 26, 2011 || Kitt Peak || Spacewatch || — || align=right | 2.1 km || 
|-id=522 bgcolor=#E9E9E9
| 408522 ||  || — || September 30, 2005 || Mount Lemmon || Mount Lemmon Survey || — || align=right | 2.5 km || 
|-id=523 bgcolor=#d6d6d6
| 408523 ||  || — || April 13, 2008 || Mount Lemmon || Mount Lemmon Survey || — || align=right | 3.0 km || 
|-id=524 bgcolor=#fefefe
| 408524 ||  || — || January 31, 1995 || Kitt Peak || Spacewatch || — || align=right data-sort-value="0.76" | 760 m || 
|-id=525 bgcolor=#d6d6d6
| 408525 ||  || — || March 12, 2007 || Kitt Peak || Spacewatch || EOS || align=right | 2.1 km || 
|-id=526 bgcolor=#E9E9E9
| 408526 ||  || — || August 29, 2005 || Kitt Peak || Spacewatch || — || align=right | 2.1 km || 
|-id=527 bgcolor=#E9E9E9
| 408527 ||  || — || September 17, 2006 || Kitt Peak || Spacewatch || — || align=right | 2.0 km || 
|-id=528 bgcolor=#d6d6d6
| 408528 ||  || — || September 12, 2004 || Kitt Peak || Spacewatch || EOS || align=right | 2.0 km || 
|-id=529 bgcolor=#d6d6d6
| 408529 ||  || — || September 22, 2009 || Kitt Peak || Spacewatch || EOS || align=right | 2.1 km || 
|-id=530 bgcolor=#d6d6d6
| 408530 ||  || — || March 13, 2007 || Mount Lemmon || Mount Lemmon Survey || — || align=right | 2.7 km || 
|-id=531 bgcolor=#fefefe
| 408531 ||  || — || March 9, 2002 || Kitt Peak || Spacewatch || — || align=right data-sort-value="0.87" | 870 m || 
|-id=532 bgcolor=#E9E9E9
| 408532 ||  || — || November 6, 2010 || Catalina || CSS || — || align=right | 1.4 km || 
|-id=533 bgcolor=#E9E9E9
| 408533 ||  || — || September 30, 2010 || Mount Lemmon || Mount Lemmon Survey || — || align=right | 1.8 km || 
|-id=534 bgcolor=#d6d6d6
| 408534 ||  || — || July 28, 2008 || Siding Spring || SSS || — || align=right | 3.1 km || 
|-id=535 bgcolor=#fefefe
| 408535 ||  || — || April 25, 2006 || Kitt Peak || Spacewatch || V || align=right data-sort-value="0.60" | 600 m || 
|-id=536 bgcolor=#E9E9E9
| 408536 ||  || — || March 11, 2003 || Kitt Peak || Spacewatch || AGN || align=right | 1.6 km || 
|-id=537 bgcolor=#E9E9E9
| 408537 ||  || — || August 21, 2006 || Kitt Peak || Spacewatch || — || align=right | 1.1 km || 
|-id=538 bgcolor=#E9E9E9
| 408538 ||  || — || July 17, 2009 || Siding Spring || SSS || — || align=right | 3.0 km || 
|-id=539 bgcolor=#E9E9E9
| 408539 ||  || — || April 20, 2004 || Kitt Peak || Spacewatch || — || align=right | 1.6 km || 
|-id=540 bgcolor=#d6d6d6
| 408540 ||  || — || February 13, 2007 || Mount Lemmon || Mount Lemmon Survey || — || align=right | 2.0 km || 
|-id=541 bgcolor=#d6d6d6
| 408541 ||  || — || September 4, 2008 || Kitt Peak || Spacewatch || — || align=right | 3.2 km || 
|-id=542 bgcolor=#d6d6d6
| 408542 ||  || — || April 10, 2002 || Socorro || LINEAR || — || align=right | 2.9 km || 
|-id=543 bgcolor=#fefefe
| 408543 ||  || — || January 15, 2005 || Socorro || LINEAR || V || align=right data-sort-value="0.82" | 820 m || 
|-id=544 bgcolor=#d6d6d6
| 408544 ||  || — || March 13, 2007 || Kitt Peak || Spacewatch || — || align=right | 2.8 km || 
|-id=545 bgcolor=#E9E9E9
| 408545 ||  || — || September 26, 2006 || Kitt Peak || Spacewatch || — || align=right | 1.1 km || 
|-id=546 bgcolor=#d6d6d6
| 408546 ||  || — || November 17, 1999 || Kitt Peak || Spacewatch || — || align=right | 2.2 km || 
|-id=547 bgcolor=#d6d6d6
| 408547 ||  || — || October 18, 1998 || Kitt Peak || Spacewatch || — || align=right | 2.9 km || 
|-id=548 bgcolor=#E9E9E9
| 408548 ||  || — || September 26, 2006 || Mount Lemmon || Mount Lemmon Survey || — || align=right | 1.0 km || 
|-id=549 bgcolor=#fefefe
| 408549 ||  || — || March 11, 2005 || Kitt Peak || Spacewatch || — || align=right data-sort-value="0.98" | 980 m || 
|-id=550 bgcolor=#fefefe
| 408550 ||  || — || November 20, 2004 || Kitt Peak || Spacewatch || — || align=right data-sort-value="0.98" | 980 m || 
|-id=551 bgcolor=#E9E9E9
| 408551 ||  || — || March 8, 2008 || Catalina || CSS || — || align=right | 2.0 km || 
|-id=552 bgcolor=#d6d6d6
| 408552 ||  || — || December 22, 2000 || Kitt Peak || Spacewatch || — || align=right | 4.1 km || 
|-id=553 bgcolor=#d6d6d6
| 408553 ||  || — || April 8, 2002 || Kitt Peak || Spacewatch || THM || align=right | 2.8 km || 
|-id=554 bgcolor=#d6d6d6
| 408554 ||  || — || October 23, 2005 || Kitt Peak || Spacewatch || — || align=right | 2.6 km || 
|-id=555 bgcolor=#d6d6d6
| 408555 ||  || — || March 16, 2007 || Kitt Peak || Spacewatch || — || align=right | 2.9 km || 
|-id=556 bgcolor=#E9E9E9
| 408556 ||  || — || November 16, 2006 || Kitt Peak || Spacewatch || — || align=right | 1.4 km || 
|-id=557 bgcolor=#d6d6d6
| 408557 ||  || — || April 12, 2002 || Kitt Peak || Spacewatch || — || align=right | 2.4 km || 
|-id=558 bgcolor=#E9E9E9
| 408558 ||  || — || December 29, 2011 || Mount Lemmon || Mount Lemmon Survey || MAR || align=right | 1.3 km || 
|-id=559 bgcolor=#E9E9E9
| 408559 ||  || — || August 21, 2006 || Kitt Peak || Spacewatch || — || align=right | 1.6 km || 
|-id=560 bgcolor=#d6d6d6
| 408560 ||  || — || May 8, 2008 || Mount Lemmon || Mount Lemmon Survey || EOS || align=right | 1.9 km || 
|-id=561 bgcolor=#d6d6d6
| 408561 ||  || — || December 16, 1999 || Kitt Peak || Spacewatch || — || align=right | 3.4 km || 
|-id=562 bgcolor=#d6d6d6
| 408562 ||  || — || October 31, 1999 || Kitt Peak || Spacewatch || — || align=right | 2.8 km || 
|-id=563 bgcolor=#d6d6d6
| 408563 ||  || — || April 20, 2007 || Kitt Peak || Spacewatch || — || align=right | 3.0 km || 
|-id=564 bgcolor=#d6d6d6
| 408564 ||  || — || January 7, 2006 || Kitt Peak || Spacewatch || — || align=right | 4.0 km || 
|-id=565 bgcolor=#d6d6d6
| 408565 ||  || — || December 30, 2005 || Kitt Peak || Spacewatch || EUP || align=right | 4.0 km || 
|-id=566 bgcolor=#fefefe
| 408566 ||  || — || May 19, 2006 || Mount Lemmon || Mount Lemmon Survey || (2076) || align=right data-sort-value="0.89" | 890 m || 
|-id=567 bgcolor=#E9E9E9
| 408567 ||  || — || August 16, 2009 || Kitt Peak || Spacewatch || — || align=right | 2.4 km || 
|-id=568 bgcolor=#E9E9E9
| 408568 ||  || — || April 28, 2000 || Anderson Mesa || LONEOS || — || align=right | 2.4 km || 
|-id=569 bgcolor=#E9E9E9
| 408569 ||  || — || November 20, 2006 || Kitt Peak || Spacewatch || (5) || align=right | 1.1 km || 
|-id=570 bgcolor=#E9E9E9
| 408570 ||  || — || July 3, 1997 || Kitt Peak || Spacewatch || EUN || align=right | 1.4 km || 
|-id=571 bgcolor=#E9E9E9
| 408571 ||  || — || December 12, 2006 || Mount Lemmon || Mount Lemmon Survey ||  || align=right | 2.9 km || 
|-id=572 bgcolor=#d6d6d6
| 408572 ||  || — || November 10, 2004 || Kitt Peak || Spacewatch || — || align=right | 3.7 km || 
|-id=573 bgcolor=#E9E9E9
| 408573 ||  || — || June 8, 2005 || Kitt Peak || Spacewatch || — || align=right | 1.3 km || 
|-id=574 bgcolor=#d6d6d6
| 408574 ||  || — || January 22, 2010 || WISE || WISE || — || align=right | 4.7 km || 
|-id=575 bgcolor=#d6d6d6
| 408575 ||  || — || November 4, 2004 || Kitt Peak || Spacewatch || — || align=right | 3.8 km || 
|-id=576 bgcolor=#E9E9E9
| 408576 ||  || — || April 14, 2008 || Kitt Peak || Spacewatch || — || align=right | 2.3 km || 
|-id=577 bgcolor=#E9E9E9
| 408577 ||  || — || February 17, 2007 || Mount Lemmon || Mount Lemmon Survey || — || align=right | 2.0 km || 
|-id=578 bgcolor=#E9E9E9
| 408578 ||  || — || September 14, 2005 || Kitt Peak || Spacewatch || — || align=right | 2.0 km || 
|-id=579 bgcolor=#d6d6d6
| 408579 ||  || — || November 4, 2004 || Kitt Peak || Spacewatch || — || align=right | 3.9 km || 
|-id=580 bgcolor=#E9E9E9
| 408580 ||  || — || February 12, 2008 || Mount Lemmon || Mount Lemmon Survey || — || align=right | 2.7 km || 
|-id=581 bgcolor=#d6d6d6
| 408581 ||  || — || September 16, 2004 || Kitt Peak || Spacewatch || — || align=right | 4.9 km || 
|-id=582 bgcolor=#E9E9E9
| 408582 ||  || — || March 13, 2008 || Kitt Peak || Spacewatch || — || align=right | 1.9 km || 
|-id=583 bgcolor=#d6d6d6
| 408583 ||  || — || April 22, 2007 || Catalina || CSS || URS || align=right | 3.8 km || 
|-id=584 bgcolor=#E9E9E9
| 408584 ||  || — || September 17, 2010 || Kitt Peak || Spacewatch || — || align=right | 1.2 km || 
|-id=585 bgcolor=#E9E9E9
| 408585 ||  || — || October 1, 2005 || Kitt Peak || Spacewatch || — || align=right | 2.0 km || 
|-id=586 bgcolor=#d6d6d6
| 408586 ||  || — || February 17, 2001 || Kitt Peak || Spacewatch || — || align=right | 3.3 km || 
|-id=587 bgcolor=#d6d6d6
| 408587 ||  || — || February 19, 2012 || Kitt Peak || Spacewatch || — || align=right | 3.1 km || 
|-id=588 bgcolor=#d6d6d6
| 408588 ||  || — || March 23, 2012 || Mount Lemmon || Mount Lemmon Survey || EOS || align=right | 2.2 km || 
|-id=589 bgcolor=#d6d6d6
| 408589 ||  || — || May 31, 2008 || Mount Lemmon || Mount Lemmon Survey || — || align=right | 2.6 km || 
|-id=590 bgcolor=#d6d6d6
| 408590 ||  || — || March 10, 2007 || Mount Lemmon || Mount Lemmon Survey || — || align=right | 2.3 km || 
|-id=591 bgcolor=#d6d6d6
| 408591 ||  || — || December 10, 2010 || Mount Lemmon || Mount Lemmon Survey || EOS || align=right | 2.1 km || 
|-id=592 bgcolor=#d6d6d6
| 408592 ||  || — || April 16, 2007 || Catalina || CSS || — || align=right | 4.0 km || 
|-id=593 bgcolor=#d6d6d6
| 408593 ||  || — || December 7, 2005 || Kitt Peak || Spacewatch || BRA || align=right | 1.5 km || 
|-id=594 bgcolor=#d6d6d6
| 408594 ||  || — || April 15, 2007 || Kitt Peak || Spacewatch || — || align=right | 3.2 km || 
|-id=595 bgcolor=#E9E9E9
| 408595 ||  || — || November 26, 2011 || Mount Lemmon || Mount Lemmon Survey || — || align=right | 1.2 km || 
|-id=596 bgcolor=#E9E9E9
| 408596 ||  || — || September 12, 2010 || Kitt Peak || Spacewatch || — || align=right | 1.5 km || 
|-id=597 bgcolor=#d6d6d6
| 408597 ||  || — || September 29, 2009 || Mount Lemmon || Mount Lemmon Survey || — || align=right | 2.6 km || 
|-id=598 bgcolor=#d6d6d6
| 408598 ||  || — || November 6, 2005 || Kitt Peak || Spacewatch || — || align=right | 3.6 km || 
|-id=599 bgcolor=#d6d6d6
| 408599 ||  || — || December 2, 2010 || Mount Lemmon || Mount Lemmon Survey || — || align=right | 2.6 km || 
|-id=600 bgcolor=#d6d6d6
| 408600 ||  || — || February 21, 2007 || Kitt Peak || Spacewatch || — || align=right | 3.3 km || 
|}

408601–408700 

|-bgcolor=#d6d6d6
| 408601 ||  || — || March 27, 1995 || Kitt Peak || Spacewatch || — || align=right | 4.4 km || 
|-id=602 bgcolor=#d6d6d6
| 408602 ||  || — || September 20, 2006 || Catalina || CSS || 3:2 || align=right | 5.6 km || 
|-id=603 bgcolor=#E9E9E9
| 408603 ||  || — || October 1, 2005 || Kitt Peak || Spacewatch || — || align=right | 1.7 km || 
|-id=604 bgcolor=#d6d6d6
| 408604 ||  || — || August 21, 2008 || Kitt Peak || Spacewatch || — || align=right | 3.3 km || 
|-id=605 bgcolor=#d6d6d6
| 408605 ||  || — || February 15, 1994 || Kitt Peak || Spacewatch || — || align=right | 3.4 km || 
|-id=606 bgcolor=#d6d6d6
| 408606 ||  || — || January 8, 2006 || Kitt Peak || Spacewatch || — || align=right | 4.1 km || 
|-id=607 bgcolor=#d6d6d6
| 408607 ||  || — || February 10, 2010 || Kitt Peak || Spacewatch || SYL7:4 || align=right | 5.1 km || 
|-id=608 bgcolor=#d6d6d6
| 408608 ||  || — || March 25, 2006 || Mount Lemmon || Mount Lemmon Survey ||  || align=right | 3.1 km || 
|-id=609 bgcolor=#C2FFFF
| 408609 ||  || — || March 26, 2007 || Mount Lemmon || Mount Lemmon Survey || L5 || align=right | 9.6 km || 
|-id=610 bgcolor=#d6d6d6
| 408610 ||  || — || March 13, 2005 || Kitt Peak || Spacewatch || — || align=right | 3.4 km || 
|-id=611 bgcolor=#E9E9E9
| 408611 ||  || — || October 6, 2008 || Mount Lemmon || Mount Lemmon Survey || — || align=right | 1.1 km || 
|-id=612 bgcolor=#E9E9E9
| 408612 ||  || — || March 12, 2010 || Catalina || CSS || — || align=right | 2.2 km || 
|-id=613 bgcolor=#fefefe
| 408613 ||  || — || March 11, 2011 || Mount Lemmon || Mount Lemmon Survey || H || align=right data-sort-value="0.44" | 440 m || 
|-id=614 bgcolor=#d6d6d6
| 408614 ||  || — || May 5, 2003 || Kitt Peak || Spacewatch || — || align=right | 3.4 km || 
|-id=615 bgcolor=#fefefe
| 408615 ||  || — || October 14, 1998 || Kitt Peak || Spacewatch || — || align=right data-sort-value="0.57" | 570 m || 
|-id=616 bgcolor=#E9E9E9
| 408616 ||  || — || April 14, 2005 || Catalina || CSS || — || align=right | 1.9 km || 
|-id=617 bgcolor=#d6d6d6
| 408617 ||  || — || November 23, 2006 || Mount Lemmon || Mount Lemmon Survey || — || align=right | 5.9 km || 
|-id=618 bgcolor=#E9E9E9
| 408618 ||  || — || October 20, 2007 || Mount Lemmon || Mount Lemmon Survey || — || align=right | 1.7 km || 
|-id=619 bgcolor=#d6d6d6
| 408619 ||  || — || October 25, 2005 || Kitt Peak || Spacewatch || — || align=right | 2.9 km || 
|-id=620 bgcolor=#E9E9E9
| 408620 ||  || — || April 6, 2005 || Mount Lemmon || Mount Lemmon Survey || — || align=right | 1.4 km || 
|-id=621 bgcolor=#fefefe
| 408621 ||  || — || April 25, 2007 || Kitt Peak || Spacewatch || — || align=right data-sort-value="0.75" | 750 m || 
|-id=622 bgcolor=#d6d6d6
| 408622 ||  || — || October 22, 2005 || Kitt Peak || Spacewatch || — || align=right | 3.9 km || 
|-id=623 bgcolor=#E9E9E9
| 408623 ||  || — || January 13, 2008 || Mount Lemmon || Mount Lemmon Survey || — || align=right | 2.6 km || 
|-id=624 bgcolor=#d6d6d6
| 408624 ||  || — || July 11, 2004 || Socorro || LINEAR || — || align=right | 2.6 km || 
|-id=625 bgcolor=#d6d6d6
| 408625 ||  || — || October 25, 2005 || Kitt Peak || Spacewatch || — || align=right | 2.6 km || 
|-id=626 bgcolor=#E9E9E9
| 408626 ||  || — || January 16, 2009 || Kitt Peak || Spacewatch || — || align=right | 1.7 km || 
|-id=627 bgcolor=#d6d6d6
| 408627 ||  || — || March 30, 2008 || Kitt Peak || Spacewatch || — || align=right | 3.3 km || 
|-id=628 bgcolor=#d6d6d6
| 408628 ||  || — || April 14, 2008 || Mount Lemmon || Mount Lemmon Survey || — || align=right | 3.1 km || 
|-id=629 bgcolor=#fefefe
| 408629 ||  || — || December 4, 2008 || Mount Lemmon || Mount Lemmon Survey || V || align=right data-sort-value="0.74" | 740 m || 
|-id=630 bgcolor=#fefefe
| 408630 ||  || — || September 16, 2001 || Socorro || LINEAR || — || align=right data-sort-value="0.62" | 620 m || 
|-id=631 bgcolor=#fefefe
| 408631 ||  || — || January 9, 2006 || Kitt Peak || Spacewatch || — || align=right | 1.9 km || 
|-id=632 bgcolor=#fefefe
| 408632 ||  || — || July 20, 2001 || Anderson Mesa || LONEOS || — || align=right data-sort-value="0.69" | 690 m || 
|-id=633 bgcolor=#E9E9E9
| 408633 ||  || — || April 11, 2005 || Kitt Peak || Spacewatch || — || align=right | 1.6 km || 
|-id=634 bgcolor=#d6d6d6
| 408634 ||  || — || January 28, 2007 || Mount Lemmon || Mount Lemmon Survey || — || align=right | 3.5 km || 
|-id=635 bgcolor=#d6d6d6
| 408635 ||  || — || February 8, 2007 || Kitt Peak || Spacewatch || — || align=right | 3.9 km || 
|-id=636 bgcolor=#fefefe
| 408636 ||  || — || March 16, 2010 || Kitt Peak || Spacewatch || — || align=right | 1.1 km || 
|-id=637 bgcolor=#E9E9E9
| 408637 ||  || — || September 27, 2006 || Catalina || CSS || — || align=right | 3.7 km || 
|-id=638 bgcolor=#E9E9E9
| 408638 ||  || — || October 3, 2006 || Mount Lemmon || Mount Lemmon Survey || — || align=right | 2.6 km || 
|-id=639 bgcolor=#E9E9E9
| 408639 ||  || — || December 15, 2001 || Socorro || LINEAR || — || align=right | 2.3 km || 
|-id=640 bgcolor=#d6d6d6
| 408640 ||  || — || March 8, 2008 || Mount Lemmon || Mount Lemmon Survey || — || align=right | 2.6 km || 
|-id=641 bgcolor=#E9E9E9
| 408641 ||  || — || April 7, 2005 || Kitt Peak || Spacewatch || — || align=right | 1.1 km || 
|-id=642 bgcolor=#d6d6d6
| 408642 ||  || — || July 3, 2010 || WISE || WISE || — || align=right | 3.1 km || 
|-id=643 bgcolor=#E9E9E9
| 408643 ||  || — || January 11, 2008 || Mount Lemmon || Mount Lemmon Survey || EUN || align=right | 1.5 km || 
|-id=644 bgcolor=#E9E9E9
| 408644 ||  || — || January 10, 2008 || Mount Lemmon || Mount Lemmon Survey || — || align=right | 2.1 km || 
|-id=645 bgcolor=#E9E9E9
| 408645 ||  || — || September 1, 2005 || Kitt Peak || Spacewatch || — || align=right | 2.0 km || 
|-id=646 bgcolor=#d6d6d6
| 408646 ||  || — || January 28, 2007 || Mount Lemmon || Mount Lemmon Survey || — || align=right | 3.7 km || 
|-id=647 bgcolor=#fefefe
| 408647 ||  || — || February 25, 2006 || Kitt Peak || Spacewatch || — || align=right data-sort-value="0.77" | 770 m || 
|-id=648 bgcolor=#d6d6d6
| 408648 ||  || — || August 21, 2003 || Campo Imperatore || CINEOS || VER || align=right | 3.1 km || 
|-id=649 bgcolor=#fefefe
| 408649 ||  || — || October 21, 2011 || Mount Lemmon || Mount Lemmon Survey || — || align=right data-sort-value="0.81" | 810 m || 
|-id=650 bgcolor=#d6d6d6
| 408650 ||  || — || September 16, 2009 || Catalina || CSS || — || align=right | 2.3 km || 
|-id=651 bgcolor=#E9E9E9
| 408651 ||  || — || May 9, 2005 || Kitt Peak || Spacewatch || — || align=right | 1.9 km || 
|-id=652 bgcolor=#fefefe
| 408652 ||  || — || November 8, 2008 || Kitt Peak || Spacewatch || — || align=right data-sort-value="0.86" | 860 m || 
|-id=653 bgcolor=#d6d6d6
| 408653 ||  || — || March 11, 2008 || Kitt Peak || Spacewatch || — || align=right | 3.0 km || 
|-id=654 bgcolor=#fefefe
| 408654 ||  || — || November 7, 2008 || Mount Lemmon || Mount Lemmon Survey || — || align=right data-sort-value="0.93" | 930 m || 
|-id=655 bgcolor=#fefefe
| 408655 ||  || — || June 20, 2007 || Kitt Peak || Spacewatch || — || align=right data-sort-value="0.91" | 910 m || 
|-id=656 bgcolor=#fefefe
| 408656 ||  || — || July 21, 2004 || Siding Spring || SSS || — || align=right data-sort-value="0.71" | 710 m || 
|-id=657 bgcolor=#fefefe
| 408657 ||  || — || February 17, 2010 || Kitt Peak || Spacewatch || — || align=right data-sort-value="0.66" | 660 m || 
|-id=658 bgcolor=#fefefe
| 408658 ||  || — || December 24, 2005 || Kitt Peak || Spacewatch || — || align=right data-sort-value="0.85" | 850 m || 
|-id=659 bgcolor=#E9E9E9
| 408659 ||  || — || May 4, 2009 || Mount Lemmon || Mount Lemmon Survey || — || align=right | 2.6 km || 
|-id=660 bgcolor=#E9E9E9
| 408660 ||  || — || June 18, 2006 || Kitt Peak || Spacewatch || — || align=right | 1.1 km || 
|-id=661 bgcolor=#fefefe
| 408661 ||  || — || February 2, 2006 || Mount Lemmon || Mount Lemmon Survey || NYS || align=right data-sort-value="0.70" | 700 m || 
|-id=662 bgcolor=#d6d6d6
| 408662 ||  || — || April 14, 2008 || Kitt Peak || Spacewatch || — || align=right | 2.4 km || 
|-id=663 bgcolor=#E9E9E9
| 408663 ||  || — || July 7, 2010 || Kitt Peak || Spacewatch || EUN || align=right | 1.3 km || 
|-id=664 bgcolor=#E9E9E9
| 408664 ||  || — || July 5, 2005 || Kitt Peak || Spacewatch || — || align=right | 2.8 km || 
|-id=665 bgcolor=#E9E9E9
| 408665 ||  || — || May 1, 2009 || Mount Lemmon || Mount Lemmon Survey || — || align=right | 1.5 km || 
|-id=666 bgcolor=#d6d6d6
| 408666 ||  || — || July 20, 2009 || Siding Spring || SSS || — || align=right | 4.2 km || 
|-id=667 bgcolor=#fefefe
| 408667 ||  || — || April 9, 2010 || Kitt Peak || Spacewatch || — || align=right data-sort-value="0.71" | 710 m || 
|-id=668 bgcolor=#E9E9E9
| 408668 ||  || — || March 30, 2009 || Mount Lemmon || Mount Lemmon Survey || — || align=right | 3.5 km || 
|-id=669 bgcolor=#d6d6d6
| 408669 ||  || — || December 29, 2005 || Mount Lemmon || Mount Lemmon Survey || (1118) || align=right | 3.8 km || 
|-id=670 bgcolor=#E9E9E9
| 408670 ||  || — || December 31, 2007 || Mount Lemmon || Mount Lemmon Survey || — || align=right | 1.6 km || 
|-id=671 bgcolor=#E9E9E9
| 408671 ||  || — || September 19, 2006 || Catalina || CSS || — || align=right | 1.0 km || 
|-id=672 bgcolor=#fefefe
| 408672 ||  || — || December 21, 2008 || Mount Lemmon || Mount Lemmon Survey || — || align=right data-sort-value="0.96" | 960 m || 
|-id=673 bgcolor=#E9E9E9
| 408673 ||  || — || March 10, 2008 || Mount Lemmon || Mount Lemmon Survey || — || align=right | 2.9 km || 
|-id=674 bgcolor=#d6d6d6
| 408674 ||  || — || May 29, 2008 || Kitt Peak || Spacewatch || — || align=right | 2.9 km || 
|-id=675 bgcolor=#d6d6d6
| 408675 ||  || — || January 12, 1996 || Kitt Peak || Spacewatch || — || align=right | 3.2 km || 
|-id=676 bgcolor=#E9E9E9
| 408676 ||  || — || June 15, 2010 || WISE || WISE || — || align=right | 2.3 km || 
|-id=677 bgcolor=#d6d6d6
| 408677 ||  || — || August 22, 2004 || Kitt Peak || Spacewatch || — || align=right | 3.2 km || 
|-id=678 bgcolor=#d6d6d6
| 408678 ||  || — || February 4, 2006 || Mount Lemmon || Mount Lemmon Survey || — || align=right | 3.5 km || 
|-id=679 bgcolor=#E9E9E9
| 408679 ||  || — || March 18, 2001 || Kitt Peak || Spacewatch || — || align=right | 1.1 km || 
|-id=680 bgcolor=#fefefe
| 408680 ||  || — || March 18, 2010 || Mount Lemmon || Mount Lemmon Survey || — || align=right data-sort-value="0.70" | 700 m || 
|-id=681 bgcolor=#d6d6d6
| 408681 ||  || — || December 2, 2010 || Mount Lemmon || Mount Lemmon Survey || VER || align=right | 3.0 km || 
|-id=682 bgcolor=#d6d6d6
| 408682 ||  || — || October 14, 2004 || Kitt Peak || Spacewatch || — || align=right | 2.9 km || 
|-id=683 bgcolor=#E9E9E9
| 408683 ||  || — || November 25, 2006 || Mount Lemmon || Mount Lemmon Survey || — || align=right | 1.8 km || 
|-id=684 bgcolor=#d6d6d6
| 408684 ||  || — || November 30, 2011 || Mount Lemmon || Mount Lemmon Survey || EOS || align=right | 2.1 km || 
|-id=685 bgcolor=#E9E9E9
| 408685 ||  || — || September 4, 2010 || Kitt Peak || Spacewatch || — || align=right | 1.8 km || 
|-id=686 bgcolor=#E9E9E9
| 408686 ||  || — || April 10, 2005 || Kitt Peak || Spacewatch || — || align=right | 1.8 km || 
|-id=687 bgcolor=#E9E9E9
| 408687 ||  || — || March 17, 2005 || Kitt Peak || Spacewatch || MAR || align=right | 1.1 km || 
|-id=688 bgcolor=#E9E9E9
| 408688 ||  || — || October 3, 2006 || Catalina || CSS || — || align=right | 1.9 km || 
|-id=689 bgcolor=#E9E9E9
| 408689 ||  || — || August 23, 2001 || Kitt Peak || Spacewatch || — || align=right | 2.5 km || 
|-id=690 bgcolor=#d6d6d6
| 408690 ||  || — || September 25, 2009 || Catalina || CSS || — || align=right | 3.6 km || 
|-id=691 bgcolor=#E9E9E9
| 408691 ||  || — || September 18, 2010 || Mount Lemmon || Mount Lemmon Survey || AGN || align=right data-sort-value="0.97" | 970 m || 
|-id=692 bgcolor=#d6d6d6
| 408692 ||  || — || October 2, 2009 || Mount Lemmon || Mount Lemmon Survey || — || align=right | 3.3 km || 
|-id=693 bgcolor=#E9E9E9
| 408693 ||  || — || February 9, 2008 || Catalina || CSS || — || align=right | 2.9 km || 
|-id=694 bgcolor=#E9E9E9
| 408694 ||  || — || November 8, 2007 || Kitt Peak || Spacewatch || — || align=right | 1.3 km || 
|-id=695 bgcolor=#fefefe
| 408695 ||  || — || November 2, 2008 || Mount Lemmon || Mount Lemmon Survey || — || align=right | 1.3 km || 
|-id=696 bgcolor=#E9E9E9
| 408696 ||  || — || February 11, 2008 || Kitt Peak || Spacewatch || — || align=right | 1.6 km || 
|-id=697 bgcolor=#fefefe
| 408697 ||  || — || March 29, 1995 || Kitt Peak || Spacewatch || — || align=right data-sort-value="0.70" | 700 m || 
|-id=698 bgcolor=#E9E9E9
| 408698 ||  || — || March 17, 2004 || Kitt Peak || Spacewatch || — || align=right | 1.8 km || 
|-id=699 bgcolor=#E9E9E9
| 408699 ||  || — || March 16, 2005 || Catalina || CSS || — || align=right | 1.9 km || 
|-id=700 bgcolor=#fefefe
| 408700 ||  || — || November 7, 2008 || Kitt Peak || Spacewatch || — || align=right data-sort-value="0.77" | 770 m || 
|}

408701–408800 

|-bgcolor=#fefefe
| 408701 ||  || — || November 8, 2008 || Kitt Peak || Spacewatch || — || align=right data-sort-value="0.67" | 670 m || 
|-id=702 bgcolor=#E9E9E9
| 408702 ||  || — || March 3, 2005 || Kitt Peak || Spacewatch || — || align=right | 1.00 km || 
|-id=703 bgcolor=#d6d6d6
| 408703 ||  || — || January 25, 2006 || Kitt Peak || Spacewatch || — || align=right | 3.5 km || 
|-id=704 bgcolor=#d6d6d6
| 408704 ||  || — || January 13, 2005 || Catalina || CSS || EUP || align=right | 4.4 km || 
|-id=705 bgcolor=#E9E9E9
| 408705 ||  || — || September 17, 2010 || Mount Lemmon || Mount Lemmon Survey || — || align=right | 1.6 km || 
|-id=706 bgcolor=#d6d6d6
| 408706 ||  || — || December 10, 2010 || Mount Lemmon || Mount Lemmon Survey || — || align=right | 2.9 km || 
|-id=707 bgcolor=#d6d6d6
| 408707 ||  || — || November 26, 2005 || Kitt Peak || Spacewatch || EOS || align=right | 2.5 km || 
|-id=708 bgcolor=#fefefe
| 408708 ||  || — || December 25, 2005 || Kitt Peak || Spacewatch || — || align=right data-sort-value="0.94" | 940 m || 
|-id=709 bgcolor=#fefefe
| 408709 ||  || — || December 28, 2005 || Kitt Peak || Spacewatch || — || align=right data-sort-value="0.72" | 720 m || 
|-id=710 bgcolor=#fefefe
| 408710 ||  || — || May 7, 2010 || Kitt Peak || Spacewatch || NYS || align=right data-sort-value="0.66" | 660 m || 
|-id=711 bgcolor=#E9E9E9
| 408711 ||  || — || August 28, 2006 || Catalina || CSS || — || align=right data-sort-value="0.65" | 650 m || 
|-id=712 bgcolor=#fefefe
| 408712 ||  || — || May 11, 2010 || Mount Lemmon || Mount Lemmon Survey || — || align=right data-sort-value="0.83" | 830 m || 
|-id=713 bgcolor=#fefefe
| 408713 ||  || — || June 13, 2007 || Kitt Peak || Spacewatch || — || align=right data-sort-value="0.91" | 910 m || 
|-id=714 bgcolor=#d6d6d6
| 408714 ||  || — || September 8, 2004 || Socorro || LINEAR || EOS || align=right | 2.6 km || 
|-id=715 bgcolor=#fefefe
| 408715 ||  || — || October 26, 2008 || Kitt Peak || Spacewatch || — || align=right data-sort-value="0.67" | 670 m || 
|-id=716 bgcolor=#d6d6d6
| 408716 ||  || — || September 25, 2009 || Mount Lemmon || Mount Lemmon Survey || — || align=right | 2.8 km || 
|-id=717 bgcolor=#fefefe
| 408717 ||  || — || March 31, 2003 || Anderson Mesa || LONEOS || — || align=right | 1.5 km || 
|-id=718 bgcolor=#E9E9E9
| 408718 ||  || — || September 20, 2006 || Kitt Peak || Spacewatch || — || align=right | 1.7 km || 
|-id=719 bgcolor=#E9E9E9
| 408719 ||  || — || September 16, 2010 || Kitt Peak || Spacewatch || AGN || align=right | 1.2 km || 
|-id=720 bgcolor=#d6d6d6
| 408720 ||  || — || April 7, 2008 || Mount Lemmon || Mount Lemmon Survey || KOR || align=right | 1.3 km || 
|-id=721 bgcolor=#d6d6d6
| 408721 ||  || — || September 15, 2004 || Kitt Peak || Spacewatch || — || align=right | 2.2 km || 
|-id=722 bgcolor=#fefefe
| 408722 ||  || — || March 14, 2010 || Mount Lemmon || Mount Lemmon Survey || — || align=right data-sort-value="0.68" | 680 m || 
|-id=723 bgcolor=#E9E9E9
| 408723 ||  || — || February 7, 2008 || Mount Lemmon || Mount Lemmon Survey || AGN || align=right | 1.1 km || 
|-id=724 bgcolor=#d6d6d6
| 408724 ||  || — || December 7, 2005 || Kitt Peak || Spacewatch || EOS || align=right | 1.8 km || 
|-id=725 bgcolor=#fefefe
| 408725 ||  || — || March 4, 2006 || Kitt Peak || Spacewatch || — || align=right data-sort-value="0.75" | 750 m || 
|-id=726 bgcolor=#fefefe
| 408726 ||  || — || March 14, 2010 || Kitt Peak || Spacewatch || — || align=right data-sort-value="0.62" | 620 m || 
|-id=727 bgcolor=#d6d6d6
| 408727 ||  || — || December 14, 2010 || Mount Lemmon || Mount Lemmon Survey || EOS || align=right | 2.4 km || 
|-id=728 bgcolor=#E9E9E9
| 408728 ||  || — || January 19, 2004 || Kitt Peak || Spacewatch || — || align=right | 1.8 km || 
|-id=729 bgcolor=#fefefe
| 408729 ||  || — || January 21, 1993 || Kitt Peak || Spacewatch || — || align=right data-sort-value="0.89" | 890 m || 
|-id=730 bgcolor=#d6d6d6
| 408730 ||  || — || October 28, 2005 || Mount Lemmon || Mount Lemmon Survey || KOR || align=right | 1.3 km || 
|-id=731 bgcolor=#E9E9E9
| 408731 ||  || — || May 25, 2009 || Kitt Peak || Spacewatch || — || align=right | 1.2 km || 
|-id=732 bgcolor=#d6d6d6
| 408732 ||  || — || October 1, 2005 || Kitt Peak || Spacewatch || KOR || align=right | 1.5 km || 
|-id=733 bgcolor=#fefefe
| 408733 ||  || — || April 15, 2007 || Kitt Peak || Spacewatch || — || align=right data-sort-value="0.75" | 750 m || 
|-id=734 bgcolor=#fefefe
| 408734 ||  || — || December 1, 2008 || Kitt Peak || Spacewatch || V || align=right data-sort-value="0.71" | 710 m || 
|-id=735 bgcolor=#fefefe
| 408735 ||  || — || April 21, 2004 || Socorro || LINEAR || — || align=right data-sort-value="0.66" | 660 m || 
|-id=736 bgcolor=#E9E9E9
| 408736 ||  || — || February 15, 1994 || Kitt Peak || Spacewatch || — || align=right | 2.0 km || 
|-id=737 bgcolor=#fefefe
| 408737 ||  || — || February 23, 1998 || Kitt Peak || Spacewatch || — || align=right data-sort-value="0.68" | 680 m || 
|-id=738 bgcolor=#fefefe
| 408738 ||  || — || September 13, 2007 || Mount Lemmon || Mount Lemmon Survey || — || align=right | 1.0 km || 
|-id=739 bgcolor=#d6d6d6
| 408739 ||  || — || January 31, 2006 || Kitt Peak || Spacewatch || VER || align=right | 3.0 km || 
|-id=740 bgcolor=#fefefe
| 408740 ||  || — || September 12, 1994 || Kitt Peak || Spacewatch || — || align=right data-sort-value="0.48" | 480 m || 
|-id=741 bgcolor=#fefefe
| 408741 ||  || — || December 27, 2005 || Kitt Peak || Spacewatch || — || align=right data-sort-value="0.71" | 710 m || 
|-id=742 bgcolor=#FA8072
| 408742 ||  || — || October 14, 1999 || Socorro || LINEAR || — || align=right | 2.8 km || 
|-id=743 bgcolor=#d6d6d6
| 408743 ||  || — || September 25, 2009 || Catalina || CSS || TIR || align=right | 3.4 km || 
|-id=744 bgcolor=#E9E9E9
| 408744 ||  || — || November 13, 2006 || Catalina || CSS || EUN || align=right | 1.5 km || 
|-id=745 bgcolor=#d6d6d6
| 408745 ||  || — || January 27, 2006 || Mount Lemmon || Mount Lemmon Survey || Tj (2.99) || align=right | 4.5 km || 
|-id=746 bgcolor=#fefefe
| 408746 ||  || — || March 28, 1995 || Kitt Peak || Spacewatch || — || align=right data-sort-value="0.94" | 940 m || 
|-id=747 bgcolor=#fefefe
| 408747 ||  || — || October 30, 2000 || Socorro || LINEAR || — || align=right data-sort-value="0.92" | 920 m || 
|-id=748 bgcolor=#fefefe
| 408748 ||  || — || September 26, 2008 || Kitt Peak || Spacewatch || — || align=right data-sort-value="0.45" | 450 m || 
|-id=749 bgcolor=#E9E9E9
| 408749 ||  || — || November 16, 2006 || Kitt Peak || Spacewatch || — || align=right | 1.6 km || 
|-id=750 bgcolor=#E9E9E9
| 408750 || 4308 P-L || — || September 24, 1960 || Palomar || PLS || (5) || align=right data-sort-value="0.80" | 800 m || 
|-id=751 bgcolor=#FFC2E0
| 408751 ||  || — || September 26, 1987 || Palomar || C. S. Shoemaker, E. M. Shoemaker || AMO || align=right data-sort-value="0.4" | 400 m || 
|-id=752 bgcolor=#FFC2E0
| 408752 ||  || — || October 3, 1991 || Palomar || J. E. Mueller || APO +1km || align=right | 1.4 km || 
|-id=753 bgcolor=#fefefe
| 408753 ||  || — || September 24, 1992 || Kitt Peak || Spacewatch || — || align=right data-sort-value="0.75" | 750 m || 
|-id=754 bgcolor=#fefefe
| 408754 ||  || — || September 27, 1992 || Kitt Peak || Spacewatch || MAS || align=right data-sort-value="0.58" | 580 m || 
|-id=755 bgcolor=#E9E9E9
| 408755 ||  || — || October 9, 1993 || Kitt Peak || Spacewatch || — || align=right | 1.1 km || 
|-id=756 bgcolor=#d6d6d6
| 408756 ||  || — || March 26, 1995 || Kitt Peak || Spacewatch || HYG || align=right | 2.8 km || 
|-id=757 bgcolor=#fefefe
| 408757 ||  || — || September 18, 1995 || Kitt Peak || Spacewatch || — || align=right | 1.0 km || 
|-id=758 bgcolor=#E9E9E9
| 408758 ||  || — || October 23, 1995 || Kitt Peak || Spacewatch || — || align=right | 2.0 km || 
|-id=759 bgcolor=#fefefe
| 408759 ||  || — || February 6, 1997 || Kitt Peak || Spacewatch || (6769) || align=right data-sort-value="0.78" | 780 m || 
|-id=760 bgcolor=#d6d6d6
| 408760 ||  || — || September 23, 1997 || Kitt Peak || Spacewatch || — || align=right | 2.8 km || 
|-id=761 bgcolor=#d6d6d6
| 408761 ||  || — || October 3, 1997 || Caussols || ODAS || URS || align=right | 4.1 km || 
|-id=762 bgcolor=#E9E9E9
| 408762 ||  || — || October 6, 1997 || Kitt Peak || Spacewatch || — || align=right | 1.6 km || 
|-id=763 bgcolor=#fefefe
| 408763 ||  || — || January 7, 1998 || Kitt Peak || Spacewatch || — || align=right data-sort-value="0.90" | 900 m || 
|-id=764 bgcolor=#E9E9E9
| 408764 ||  || — || January 23, 1998 || Kitt Peak || Spacewatch || — || align=right | 1.8 km || 
|-id=765 bgcolor=#E9E9E9
| 408765 ||  || — || February 22, 1998 || Kitt Peak || Spacewatch || — || align=right | 2.3 km || 
|-id=766 bgcolor=#d6d6d6
| 408766 ||  || — || August 30, 1998 || Kitt Peak || Spacewatch || — || align=right | 3.1 km || 
|-id=767 bgcolor=#d6d6d6
| 408767 ||  || — || September 20, 1998 || Kitt Peak || Spacewatch || — || align=right | 2.3 km || 
|-id=768 bgcolor=#FA8072
| 408768 ||  || — || September 26, 1998 || Socorro || LINEAR || — || align=right data-sort-value="0.71" | 710 m || 
|-id=769 bgcolor=#d6d6d6
| 408769 ||  || — || October 13, 1998 || Kitt Peak || Spacewatch || EOS || align=right | 2.0 km || 
|-id=770 bgcolor=#d6d6d6
| 408770 ||  || — || October 15, 1998 || Kitt Peak || Spacewatch || — || align=right | 3.3 km || 
|-id=771 bgcolor=#d6d6d6
| 408771 ||  || — || October 18, 1998 || Kitt Peak || Spacewatch || EOS || align=right | 1.6 km || 
|-id=772 bgcolor=#d6d6d6
| 408772 ||  || — || November 17, 1998 || Caussols || ODAS || — || align=right | 4.9 km || 
|-id=773 bgcolor=#d6d6d6
| 408773 ||  || — || November 16, 1998 || Kitt Peak || Spacewatch || — || align=right | 3.5 km || 
|-id=774 bgcolor=#E9E9E9
| 408774 ||  || — || December 8, 1998 || Kitt Peak || Spacewatch || — || align=right | 1.1 km || 
|-id=775 bgcolor=#E9E9E9
| 408775 ||  || — || February 11, 1999 || Socorro || LINEAR || — || align=right | 1.6 km || 
|-id=776 bgcolor=#E9E9E9
| 408776 ||  || — || April 9, 1999 || Kitt Peak || Spacewatch || — || align=right | 1.8 km || 
|-id=777 bgcolor=#fefefe
| 408777 ||  || — || May 8, 1999 || Catalina || CSS || — || align=right | 1.1 km || 
|-id=778 bgcolor=#fefefe
| 408778 ||  || — || September 6, 1999 || Kitt Peak || Spacewatch || NYS || align=right data-sort-value="0.68" | 680 m || 
|-id=779 bgcolor=#fefefe
| 408779 ||  || — || October 31, 1999 || Kitt Peak || Spacewatch || MAS || align=right data-sort-value="0.66" | 660 m || 
|-id=780 bgcolor=#d6d6d6
| 408780 ||  || — || November 2, 1999 || Kitt Peak || Spacewatch || TEL || align=right | 1.2 km || 
|-id=781 bgcolor=#fefefe
| 408781 ||  || — || November 4, 1999 || Socorro || LINEAR || NYS || align=right data-sort-value="0.72" | 720 m || 
|-id=782 bgcolor=#fefefe
| 408782 ||  || — || November 4, 1999 || Socorro || LINEAR || — || align=right data-sort-value="0.87" | 870 m || 
|-id=783 bgcolor=#d6d6d6
| 408783 ||  || — || November 4, 1999 || Socorro || LINEAR || — || align=right | 4.0 km || 
|-id=784 bgcolor=#fefefe
| 408784 ||  || — || November 17, 1999 || Kitt Peak || Spacewatch || — || align=right data-sort-value="0.86" | 860 m || 
|-id=785 bgcolor=#fefefe
| 408785 ||  || — || December 7, 1999 || Kitt Peak || Spacewatch || MAS || align=right data-sort-value="0.76" | 760 m || 
|-id=786 bgcolor=#fefefe
| 408786 ||  || — || December 7, 1999 || Kitt Peak || Spacewatch || — || align=right data-sort-value="0.64" | 640 m || 
|-id=787 bgcolor=#d6d6d6
| 408787 ||  || — || January 8, 2000 || Kitt Peak || Spacewatch || — || align=right | 3.3 km || 
|-id=788 bgcolor=#d6d6d6
| 408788 ||  || — || January 26, 2000 || Kitt Peak || Spacewatch || — || align=right | 3.1 km || 
|-id=789 bgcolor=#d6d6d6
| 408789 ||  || — || February 29, 2000 || Socorro || LINEAR || — || align=right | 3.7 km || 
|-id=790 bgcolor=#E9E9E9
| 408790 ||  || — || March 12, 2000 || Kitt Peak || Spacewatch || — || align=right data-sort-value="0.77" | 770 m || 
|-id=791 bgcolor=#d6d6d6
| 408791 ||  || — || March 25, 2000 || Kitt Peak || Spacewatch || VER || align=right | 2.6 km || 
|-id=792 bgcolor=#FFC2E0
| 408792 ||  || — || April 3, 2000 || Socorro || LINEAR || APOPHA || align=right data-sort-value="0.30" | 300 m || 
|-id=793 bgcolor=#E9E9E9
| 408793 ||  || — || April 5, 2000 || Socorro || LINEAR || — || align=right | 1.3 km || 
|-id=794 bgcolor=#FA8072
| 408794 ||  || — || April 10, 2000 || Kitt Peak || M. W. Buie || — || align=right data-sort-value="0.87" | 870 m || 
|-id=795 bgcolor=#FA8072
| 408795 ||  || — || May 4, 2000 || Anderson Mesa || LONEOS || — || align=right data-sort-value="0.86" | 860 m || 
|-id=796 bgcolor=#E9E9E9
| 408796 ||  || — || July 3, 2000 || Kitt Peak || Spacewatch || — || align=right | 2.7 km || 
|-id=797 bgcolor=#fefefe
| 408797 ||  || — || September 22, 2000 || Kitt Peak || Spacewatch || — || align=right data-sort-value="0.96" | 960 m || 
|-id=798 bgcolor=#fefefe
| 408798 ||  || — || September 20, 2000 || Kitt Peak || Spacewatch || — || align=right data-sort-value="0.56" | 560 m || 
|-id=799 bgcolor=#FA8072
| 408799 ||  || — || September 24, 2000 || Socorro || LINEAR || — || align=right data-sort-value="0.62" | 620 m || 
|-id=800 bgcolor=#fefefe
| 408800 ||  || — || September 24, 2000 || Socorro || LINEAR || — || align=right data-sort-value="0.59" | 590 m || 
|}

408801–408900 

|-bgcolor=#E9E9E9
| 408801 ||  || — || September 23, 2000 || Socorro || LINEAR || — || align=right | 2.3 km || 
|-id=802 bgcolor=#E9E9E9
| 408802 ||  || — || September 23, 2000 || Socorro || LINEAR ||  || align=right | 3.0 km || 
|-id=803 bgcolor=#fefefe
| 408803 ||  || — || September 24, 2000 || Socorro || LINEAR || — || align=right data-sort-value="0.92" | 920 m || 
|-id=804 bgcolor=#d6d6d6
| 408804 ||  || — || September 24, 2000 || Socorro || LINEAR || BRA || align=right | 1.9 km || 
|-id=805 bgcolor=#E9E9E9
| 408805 ||  || — || September 27, 2000 || Socorro || LINEAR || — || align=right | 2.2 km || 
|-id=806 bgcolor=#fefefe
| 408806 ||  || — || September 24, 2000 || Socorro || LINEAR || — || align=right data-sort-value="0.68" | 680 m || 
|-id=807 bgcolor=#fefefe
| 408807 ||  || — || September 24, 2000 || Socorro || LINEAR || — || align=right data-sort-value="0.94" | 940 m || 
|-id=808 bgcolor=#E9E9E9
| 408808 ||  || — || September 24, 2000 || Socorro || LINEAR || — || align=right | 2.4 km || 
|-id=809 bgcolor=#E9E9E9
| 408809 ||  || — || October 1, 2000 || Socorro || LINEAR || — || align=right | 2.8 km || 
|-id=810 bgcolor=#E9E9E9
| 408810 ||  || — || October 1, 2000 || Socorro || LINEAR || DOR || align=right | 2.7 km || 
|-id=811 bgcolor=#E9E9E9
| 408811 ||  || — || October 24, 2000 || Socorro || LINEAR || — || align=right | 3.4 km || 
|-id=812 bgcolor=#E9E9E9
| 408812 ||  || — || October 24, 2000 || Socorro || LINEAR || — || align=right | 2.9 km || 
|-id=813 bgcolor=#E9E9E9
| 408813 ||  || — || October 25, 2000 || Socorro || LINEAR || — || align=right | 2.5 km || 
|-id=814 bgcolor=#fefefe
| 408814 ||  || — || October 31, 2000 || Socorro || LINEAR || — || align=right data-sort-value="0.92" | 920 m || 
|-id=815 bgcolor=#fefefe
| 408815 ||  || — || October 30, 2000 || Socorro || LINEAR || — || align=right data-sort-value="0.89" | 890 m || 
|-id=816 bgcolor=#fefefe
| 408816 ||  || — || November 20, 2000 || Kitt Peak || Spacewatch || — || align=right data-sort-value="0.75" | 750 m || 
|-id=817 bgcolor=#fefefe
| 408817 ||  || — || November 24, 2000 || Kitt Peak || Spacewatch || — || align=right data-sort-value="0.55" | 550 m || 
|-id=818 bgcolor=#fefefe
| 408818 ||  || — || November 21, 2000 || Socorro || LINEAR || — || align=right data-sort-value="0.89" | 890 m || 
|-id=819 bgcolor=#d6d6d6
| 408819 ||  || — || December 30, 2000 || Socorro || LINEAR || — || align=right | 3.0 km || 
|-id=820 bgcolor=#E9E9E9
| 408820 ||  || — || March 18, 2001 || Socorro || LINEAR || — || align=right | 2.6 km || 
|-id=821 bgcolor=#E9E9E9
| 408821 ||  || — || March 19, 2001 || Anderson Mesa || LONEOS || — || align=right data-sort-value="0.98" | 980 m || 
|-id=822 bgcolor=#fefefe
| 408822 ||  || — || March 21, 2001 || Kitt Peak || SKADS || — || align=right data-sort-value="0.64" | 640 m || 
|-id=823 bgcolor=#E9E9E9
| 408823 ||  || — || May 21, 2001 || Socorro || LINEAR || — || align=right | 1.9 km || 
|-id=824 bgcolor=#fefefe
| 408824 ||  || — || July 20, 2001 || Palomar || NEAT || H || align=right data-sort-value="0.82" | 820 m || 
|-id=825 bgcolor=#FA8072
| 408825 ||  || — || July 29, 2001 || Anderson Mesa || LONEOS || unusual || align=right | 2.7 km || 
|-id=826 bgcolor=#E9E9E9
| 408826 ||  || — || August 10, 2001 || Palomar || NEAT || — || align=right | 2.2 km || 
|-id=827 bgcolor=#d6d6d6
| 408827 ||  || — || August 12, 2001 || Palomar || NEAT || 7:4 || align=right | 4.2 km || 
|-id=828 bgcolor=#E9E9E9
| 408828 ||  || — || August 16, 2001 || Palomar || NEAT || BAR || align=right | 1.7 km || 
|-id=829 bgcolor=#E9E9E9
| 408829 ||  || — || August 23, 2001 || Anderson Mesa || LONEOS || EUN || align=right | 1.4 km || 
|-id=830 bgcolor=#E9E9E9
| 408830 ||  || — || August 19, 2001 || Anderson Mesa || LONEOS || — || align=right | 2.0 km || 
|-id=831 bgcolor=#E9E9E9
| 408831 ||  || — || August 17, 2001 || Palomar || NEAT || — || align=right | 2.2 km || 
|-id=832 bgcolor=#C2E0FF
| 408832 ||  || — || August 21, 2001 || Cerro Tololo || M. W. Buie || cubewano (cold)critical || align=right | 266 km || 
|-id=833 bgcolor=#E9E9E9
| 408833 ||  || — || August 23, 2001 || Anderson Mesa || LONEOS || — || align=right | 1.5 km || 
|-id=834 bgcolor=#E9E9E9
| 408834 ||  || — || August 16, 2001 || Socorro || LINEAR || — || align=right | 1.9 km || 
|-id=835 bgcolor=#E9E9E9
| 408835 ||  || — || September 12, 2001 || Socorro || LINEAR || EUN || align=right | 1.5 km || 
|-id=836 bgcolor=#E9E9E9
| 408836 ||  || — || September 12, 2001 || Kitt Peak || Spacewatch || — || align=right | 1.4 km || 
|-id=837 bgcolor=#fefefe
| 408837 ||  || — || August 23, 2001 || Anderson Mesa || LONEOS || (2076) || align=right data-sort-value="0.90" | 900 m || 
|-id=838 bgcolor=#E9E9E9
| 408838 ||  || — || September 12, 2001 || Socorro || LINEAR || EUN || align=right | 1.1 km || 
|-id=839 bgcolor=#fefefe
| 408839 ||  || — || September 12, 2001 || Socorro || LINEAR || — || align=right data-sort-value="0.67" | 670 m || 
|-id=840 bgcolor=#E9E9E9
| 408840 ||  || — || September 12, 2001 || Socorro || LINEAR || — || align=right | 1.9 km || 
|-id=841 bgcolor=#E9E9E9
| 408841 ||  || — || September 12, 2001 || Socorro || LINEAR || — || align=right | 1.5 km || 
|-id=842 bgcolor=#E9E9E9
| 408842 ||  || — || September 10, 2001 || Anderson Mesa || LONEOS || ADE || align=right | 2.5 km || 
|-id=843 bgcolor=#E9E9E9
| 408843 ||  || — || September 11, 2001 || Kitt Peak || Spacewatch || — || align=right | 1.6 km || 
|-id=844 bgcolor=#E9E9E9
| 408844 ||  || — || September 16, 2001 || Socorro || LINEAR || — || align=right | 1.7 km || 
|-id=845 bgcolor=#E9E9E9
| 408845 ||  || — || September 17, 2001 || Socorro || LINEAR || EUN || align=right | 1.4 km || 
|-id=846 bgcolor=#fefefe
| 408846 ||  || — || September 19, 2001 || Anderson Mesa || LONEOS || H || align=right data-sort-value="0.79" | 790 m || 
|-id=847 bgcolor=#E9E9E9
| 408847 ||  || — || August 27, 2001 || Kitt Peak || Spacewatch || — || align=right | 1.5 km || 
|-id=848 bgcolor=#fefefe
| 408848 ||  || — || September 20, 2001 || Socorro || LINEAR || — || align=right data-sort-value="0.74" | 740 m || 
|-id=849 bgcolor=#E9E9E9
| 408849 ||  || — || September 16, 2001 || Socorro || LINEAR || — || align=right | 1.7 km || 
|-id=850 bgcolor=#E9E9E9
| 408850 ||  || — || September 16, 2001 || Socorro || LINEAR || — || align=right | 1.8 km || 
|-id=851 bgcolor=#fefefe
| 408851 ||  || — || September 16, 2001 || Socorro || LINEAR || — || align=right data-sort-value="0.77" | 770 m || 
|-id=852 bgcolor=#E9E9E9
| 408852 ||  || — || September 16, 2001 || Socorro || LINEAR || — || align=right | 1.5 km || 
|-id=853 bgcolor=#E9E9E9
| 408853 ||  || — || September 16, 2001 || Socorro || LINEAR || — || align=right | 1.8 km || 
|-id=854 bgcolor=#fefefe
| 408854 ||  || — || September 19, 2001 || Socorro || LINEAR || — || align=right data-sort-value="0.75" | 750 m || 
|-id=855 bgcolor=#E9E9E9
| 408855 ||  || — || September 19, 2001 || Socorro || LINEAR || — || align=right | 1.4 km || 
|-id=856 bgcolor=#E9E9E9
| 408856 ||  || — || September 19, 2001 || Socorro || LINEAR || — || align=right | 1.5 km || 
|-id=857 bgcolor=#E9E9E9
| 408857 ||  || — || September 19, 2001 || Socorro || LINEAR || — || align=right | 1.5 km || 
|-id=858 bgcolor=#fefefe
| 408858 ||  || — || September 19, 2001 || Socorro || LINEAR || — || align=right data-sort-value="0.58" | 580 m || 
|-id=859 bgcolor=#E9E9E9
| 408859 ||  || — || September 19, 2001 || Socorro || LINEAR || — || align=right | 1.8 km || 
|-id=860 bgcolor=#E9E9E9
| 408860 ||  || — || September 20, 2001 || Socorro || LINEAR || — || align=right | 1.4 km || 
|-id=861 bgcolor=#E9E9E9
| 408861 ||  || — || September 19, 2001 || Kitt Peak || Spacewatch || — || align=right | 1.3 km || 
|-id=862 bgcolor=#fefefe
| 408862 ||  || — || September 24, 2001 || Socorro || LINEAR || H || align=right data-sort-value="0.85" | 850 m || 
|-id=863 bgcolor=#E9E9E9
| 408863 ||  || — || September 27, 2001 || Socorro || LINEAR || JUN || align=right | 1.6 km || 
|-id=864 bgcolor=#fefefe
| 408864 ||  || — || September 17, 2001 || Socorro || LINEAR || — || align=right data-sort-value="0.73" | 730 m || 
|-id=865 bgcolor=#E9E9E9
| 408865 ||  || — || September 12, 2001 || Kitt Peak || Spacewatch || MIS || align=right | 2.1 km || 
|-id=866 bgcolor=#E9E9E9
| 408866 ||  || — || September 25, 2001 || Socorro || LINEAR || — || align=right | 1.7 km || 
|-id=867 bgcolor=#fefefe
| 408867 ||  || — || September 19, 2001 || Socorro || LINEAR || — || align=right data-sort-value="0.86" | 860 m || 
|-id=868 bgcolor=#fefefe
| 408868 ||  || — || September 16, 2001 || Socorro || LINEAR || — || align=right data-sort-value="0.74" | 740 m || 
|-id=869 bgcolor=#FFC2E0
| 408869 ||  || — || September 26, 2001 || Socorro || LINEAR || AMO || align=right data-sort-value="0.57" | 570 m || 
|-id=870 bgcolor=#E9E9E9
| 408870 ||  || — || September 20, 2001 || Socorro || LINEAR || EUN || align=right | 1.3 km || 
|-id=871 bgcolor=#E9E9E9
| 408871 ||  || — || September 25, 2001 || Kitt Peak || Spacewatch || — || align=right | 1.6 km || 
|-id=872 bgcolor=#E9E9E9
| 408872 ||  || — || September 25, 2001 || Socorro || LINEAR || — || align=right | 1.5 km || 
|-id=873 bgcolor=#E9E9E9
| 408873 ||  || — || October 15, 2001 || Socorro || LINEAR || — || align=right | 2.4 km || 
|-id=874 bgcolor=#E9E9E9
| 408874 ||  || — || October 15, 2001 || Socorro || LINEAR || — || align=right | 1.8 km || 
|-id=875 bgcolor=#FA8072
| 408875 ||  || — || August 22, 2001 || Socorro || LINEAR || — || align=right data-sort-value="0.71" | 710 m || 
|-id=876 bgcolor=#FA8072
| 408876 ||  || — || September 19, 2001 || Anderson Mesa || LONEOS || — || align=right | 2.3 km || 
|-id=877 bgcolor=#E9E9E9
| 408877 ||  || — || August 25, 2001 || Anderson Mesa || LONEOS || — || align=right | 1.5 km || 
|-id=878 bgcolor=#E9E9E9
| 408878 ||  || — || October 14, 2001 || Socorro || LINEAR || — || align=right | 1.7 km || 
|-id=879 bgcolor=#E9E9E9
| 408879 ||  || — || October 14, 2001 || Socorro || LINEAR || HNS || align=right | 1.2 km || 
|-id=880 bgcolor=#E9E9E9
| 408880 ||  || — || October 11, 2001 || Socorro || LINEAR || — || align=right | 1.8 km || 
|-id=881 bgcolor=#E9E9E9
| 408881 ||  || — || October 10, 2001 || Palomar || NEAT || — || align=right | 1.9 km || 
|-id=882 bgcolor=#E9E9E9
| 408882 ||  || — || October 15, 2001 || Palomar || NEAT || — || align=right | 1.6 km || 
|-id=883 bgcolor=#fefefe
| 408883 ||  || — || October 14, 2001 || Apache Point || SDSS || — || align=right data-sort-value="0.49" | 490 m || 
|-id=884 bgcolor=#E9E9E9
| 408884 ||  || — || October 8, 2001 || Palomar || NEAT || — || align=right | 1.8 km || 
|-id=885 bgcolor=#E9E9E9
| 408885 ||  || — || October 15, 2001 || Palomar || NEAT || — || align=right | 1.2 km || 
|-id=886 bgcolor=#fefefe
| 408886 ||  || — || October 17, 2001 || Socorro || LINEAR || H || align=right data-sort-value="0.89" | 890 m || 
|-id=887 bgcolor=#E9E9E9
| 408887 ||  || — || October 24, 2001 || Desert Eagle || W. K. Y. Yeung || — || align=right | 1.7 km || 
|-id=888 bgcolor=#E9E9E9
| 408888 ||  || — || September 19, 2001 || Socorro || LINEAR || — || align=right | 2.2 km || 
|-id=889 bgcolor=#E9E9E9
| 408889 ||  || — || October 24, 2001 || Desert Eagle || W. K. Y. Yeung || — || align=right | 2.2 km || 
|-id=890 bgcolor=#E9E9E9
| 408890 ||  || — || October 16, 2001 || Socorro || LINEAR || — || align=right | 1.6 km || 
|-id=891 bgcolor=#fefefe
| 408891 ||  || — || October 17, 2001 || Socorro || LINEAR || — || align=right data-sort-value="0.75" | 750 m || 
|-id=892 bgcolor=#E9E9E9
| 408892 ||  || — || September 20, 2001 || Socorro || LINEAR || — || align=right | 2.1 km || 
|-id=893 bgcolor=#E9E9E9
| 408893 ||  || — || October 14, 2001 || Kitt Peak || Spacewatch || EUN || align=right | 1.5 km || 
|-id=894 bgcolor=#E9E9E9
| 408894 ||  || — || October 16, 2001 || Kitt Peak || Spacewatch || — || align=right | 1.4 km || 
|-id=895 bgcolor=#E9E9E9
| 408895 ||  || — || October 20, 2001 || Socorro || LINEAR || JUN || align=right | 1.1 km || 
|-id=896 bgcolor=#fefefe
| 408896 ||  || — || October 20, 2001 || Socorro || LINEAR || — || align=right data-sort-value="0.70" | 700 m || 
|-id=897 bgcolor=#E9E9E9
| 408897 ||  || — || October 23, 2001 || Palomar || NEAT || — || align=right | 2.1 km || 
|-id=898 bgcolor=#E9E9E9
| 408898 ||  || — || October 16, 2001 || Palomar || NEAT || (5) || align=right | 1.0 km || 
|-id=899 bgcolor=#E9E9E9
| 408899 ||  || — || October 14, 2001 || Socorro || LINEAR || — || align=right | 1.8 km || 
|-id=900 bgcolor=#E9E9E9
| 408900 ||  || — || October 16, 2001 || Palomar || NEAT || (5) || align=right data-sort-value="0.89" | 890 m || 
|}

408901–409000 

|-bgcolor=#E9E9E9
| 408901 ||  || — || November 9, 2001 || Socorro || LINEAR || ADE || align=right | 3.0 km || 
|-id=902 bgcolor=#E9E9E9
| 408902 ||  || — || November 9, 2001 || Socorro || LINEAR || — || align=right | 1.9 km || 
|-id=903 bgcolor=#E9E9E9
| 408903 ||  || — || November 10, 2001 || Socorro || LINEAR || — || align=right | 2.6 km || 
|-id=904 bgcolor=#fefefe
| 408904 ||  || — || November 10, 2001 || Socorro || LINEAR || — || align=right | 1.1 km || 
|-id=905 bgcolor=#E9E9E9
| 408905 ||  || — || November 10, 2001 || Socorro || LINEAR || — || align=right | 1.7 km || 
|-id=906 bgcolor=#E9E9E9
| 408906 ||  || — || October 21, 2001 || Socorro || LINEAR || — || align=right | 1.7 km || 
|-id=907 bgcolor=#fefefe
| 408907 ||  || — || November 12, 2001 || Socorro || LINEAR || — || align=right | 1.0 km || 
|-id=908 bgcolor=#E9E9E9
| 408908 ||  || — || November 12, 2001 || Socorro || LINEAR || — || align=right | 2.9 km || 
|-id=909 bgcolor=#E9E9E9
| 408909 ||  || — || November 12, 2001 || Socorro || LINEAR || CLO || align=right | 3.0 km || 
|-id=910 bgcolor=#E9E9E9
| 408910 ||  || — || October 17, 2001 || Socorro || LINEAR || — || align=right | 1.5 km || 
|-id=911 bgcolor=#E9E9E9
| 408911 ||  || — || November 19, 2001 || Socorro || LINEAR || — || align=right | 1.9 km || 
|-id=912 bgcolor=#E9E9E9
| 408912 ||  || — || November 19, 2001 || Socorro || LINEAR || — || align=right | 1.3 km || 
|-id=913 bgcolor=#E9E9E9
| 408913 ||  || — || November 19, 2001 || Socorro || LINEAR || — || align=right | 1.8 km || 
|-id=914 bgcolor=#E9E9E9
| 408914 ||  || — || November 20, 2001 || Socorro || LINEAR || — || align=right | 3.1 km || 
|-id=915 bgcolor=#E9E9E9
| 408915 ||  || — || November 11, 2001 || Kitt Peak || Spacewatch || NEM || align=right | 2.5 km || 
|-id=916 bgcolor=#E9E9E9
| 408916 ||  || — || November 19, 2001 || Anderson Mesa || LONEOS || — || align=right | 2.1 km || 
|-id=917 bgcolor=#E9E9E9
| 408917 ||  || — || December 10, 2001 || Kitt Peak || Spacewatch || EUN || align=right | 1.6 km || 
|-id=918 bgcolor=#E9E9E9
| 408918 ||  || — || October 15, 2001 || Socorro || LINEAR || — || align=right | 1.6 km || 
|-id=919 bgcolor=#fefefe
| 408919 ||  || — || December 10, 2001 || Socorro || LINEAR || — || align=right data-sort-value="0.79" | 790 m || 
|-id=920 bgcolor=#E9E9E9
| 408920 ||  || — || November 20, 2001 || Socorro || LINEAR || — || align=right | 2.1 km || 
|-id=921 bgcolor=#E9E9E9
| 408921 ||  || — || December 11, 2001 || Socorro || LINEAR || — || align=right | 1.7 km || 
|-id=922 bgcolor=#fefefe
| 408922 ||  || — || December 10, 2001 || Socorro || LINEAR || H || align=right | 1.0 km || 
|-id=923 bgcolor=#E9E9E9
| 408923 ||  || — || December 14, 2001 || Socorro || LINEAR || JUN || align=right | 1.2 km || 
|-id=924 bgcolor=#fefefe
| 408924 ||  || — || December 14, 2001 || Socorro || LINEAR || — || align=right | 1.0 km || 
|-id=925 bgcolor=#E9E9E9
| 408925 ||  || — || December 14, 2001 || Socorro || LINEAR || — || align=right | 2.3 km || 
|-id=926 bgcolor=#E9E9E9
| 408926 ||  || — || December 15, 2001 || Socorro || LINEAR || — || align=right | 1.5 km || 
|-id=927 bgcolor=#E9E9E9
| 408927 ||  || — || December 14, 2001 || Palomar || NEAT || — || align=right | 2.7 km || 
|-id=928 bgcolor=#E9E9E9
| 408928 ||  || — || December 11, 2001 || Socorro || LINEAR || — || align=right | 2.5 km || 
|-id=929 bgcolor=#E9E9E9
| 408929 ||  || — || December 18, 2001 || Socorro || LINEAR || — || align=right | 2.9 km || 
|-id=930 bgcolor=#E9E9E9
| 408930 ||  || — || December 18, 2001 || Socorro || LINEAR || — || align=right | 3.8 km || 
|-id=931 bgcolor=#E9E9E9
| 408931 ||  || — || December 19, 2001 || Palomar || NEAT || — || align=right | 2.6 km || 
|-id=932 bgcolor=#fefefe
| 408932 ||  || — || January 9, 2002 || Socorro || LINEAR || H || align=right data-sort-value="0.77" | 770 m || 
|-id=933 bgcolor=#fefefe
| 408933 ||  || — || January 8, 2002 || Socorro || LINEAR || H || align=right data-sort-value="0.70" | 700 m || 
|-id=934 bgcolor=#fefefe
| 408934 ||  || — || January 9, 2002 || Socorro || LINEAR || — || align=right data-sort-value="0.64" | 640 m || 
|-id=935 bgcolor=#E9E9E9
| 408935 ||  || — || January 14, 2002 || Socorro || LINEAR || — || align=right | 2.3 km || 
|-id=936 bgcolor=#E9E9E9
| 408936 ||  || — || January 14, 2002 || Socorro || LINEAR || — || align=right | 3.0 km || 
|-id=937 bgcolor=#fefefe
| 408937 ||  || — || February 7, 2002 || Socorro || LINEAR || — || align=right data-sort-value="0.75" | 750 m || 
|-id=938 bgcolor=#fefefe
| 408938 ||  || — || February 7, 2002 || Socorro || LINEAR || — || align=right data-sort-value="0.87" | 870 m || 
|-id=939 bgcolor=#FA8072
| 408939 ||  || — || February 8, 2002 || Socorro || LINEAR || H || align=right data-sort-value="0.71" | 710 m || 
|-id=940 bgcolor=#E9E9E9
| 408940 ||  || — || January 12, 2002 || Kitt Peak || Spacewatch || — || align=right | 2.8 km || 
|-id=941 bgcolor=#fefefe
| 408941 ||  || — || February 7, 2002 || Socorro || LINEAR || — || align=right data-sort-value="0.74" | 740 m || 
|-id=942 bgcolor=#E9E9E9
| 408942 ||  || — || January 6, 2002 || Kitt Peak || Spacewatch || — || align=right | 2.6 km || 
|-id=943 bgcolor=#d6d6d6
| 408943 ||  || — || February 10, 2002 || Socorro || LINEAR || — || align=right | 4.1 km || 
|-id=944 bgcolor=#E9E9E9
| 408944 ||  || — || January 9, 2002 || Kitt Peak || Spacewatch || DOR || align=right | 2.7 km || 
|-id=945 bgcolor=#fefefe
| 408945 ||  || — || February 11, 2002 || Socorro || LINEAR || V || align=right data-sort-value="0.59" | 590 m || 
|-id=946 bgcolor=#fefefe
| 408946 ||  || — || February 12, 2002 || Palomar || NEAT || H || align=right data-sort-value="0.90" | 900 m || 
|-id=947 bgcolor=#fefefe
| 408947 ||  || — || February 19, 2002 || Socorro || LINEAR || — || align=right | 1.2 km || 
|-id=948 bgcolor=#fefefe
| 408948 ||  || — || February 22, 2002 || Palomar || NEAT || — || align=right data-sort-value="0.84" | 840 m || 
|-id=949 bgcolor=#fefefe
| 408949 ||  || — || March 12, 2002 || Socorro || LINEAR || NYS || align=right data-sort-value="0.71" | 710 m || 
|-id=950 bgcolor=#fefefe
| 408950 ||  || — || March 13, 2002 || Socorro || LINEAR || — || align=right data-sort-value="0.89" | 890 m || 
|-id=951 bgcolor=#fefefe
| 408951 ||  || — || March 10, 2002 || Anderson Mesa || LONEOS || — || align=right data-sort-value="0.74" | 740 m || 
|-id=952 bgcolor=#fefefe
| 408952 ||  || — || March 13, 2002 || Palomar || NEAT || — || align=right | 1.0 km || 
|-id=953 bgcolor=#fefefe
| 408953 ||  || — || March 15, 2002 || Kitt Peak || Spacewatch || — || align=right data-sort-value="0.74" | 740 m || 
|-id=954 bgcolor=#fefefe
| 408954 ||  || — || March 5, 2002 || Kitt Peak || Spacewatch || — || align=right data-sort-value="0.91" | 910 m || 
|-id=955 bgcolor=#fefefe
| 408955 ||  || — || March 20, 2002 || Socorro || LINEAR || — || align=right data-sort-value="0.89" | 890 m || 
|-id=956 bgcolor=#fefefe
| 408956 ||  || — || April 5, 2002 || Anderson Mesa || LONEOS || — || align=right | 1.2 km || 
|-id=957 bgcolor=#d6d6d6
| 408957 ||  || — || April 9, 2002 || Kitt Peak || Spacewatch || — || align=right | 3.4 km || 
|-id=958 bgcolor=#fefefe
| 408958 ||  || — || April 12, 2002 || Palomar || NEAT || — || align=right data-sort-value="0.85" | 850 m || 
|-id=959 bgcolor=#d6d6d6
| 408959 ||  || — || April 12, 2002 || Haleakala || NEAT || — || align=right | 4.2 km || 
|-id=960 bgcolor=#fefefe
| 408960 ||  || — || April 13, 2002 || Kitt Peak || Spacewatch || — || align=right data-sort-value="0.86" | 860 m || 
|-id=961 bgcolor=#fefefe
| 408961 ||  || — || April 8, 2002 || Palomar || NEAT || — || align=right | 1.3 km || 
|-id=962 bgcolor=#d6d6d6
| 408962 ||  || — || May 1, 2002 || Palomar || NEAT || LIX || align=right | 3.6 km || 
|-id=963 bgcolor=#d6d6d6
| 408963 ||  || — || May 17, 2002 || Socorro || LINEAR || — || align=right | 3.2 km || 
|-id=964 bgcolor=#fefefe
| 408964 ||  || — || July 2, 2002 || Palomar || NEAT || — || align=right | 2.4 km || 
|-id=965 bgcolor=#E9E9E9
| 408965 ||  || — || July 8, 2002 || Palomar || NEAT || — || align=right | 2.0 km || 
|-id=966 bgcolor=#d6d6d6
| 408966 ||  || — || July 19, 2002 || Palomar || NEAT || — || align=right | 3.1 km || 
|-id=967 bgcolor=#d6d6d6
| 408967 ||  || — || July 22, 2002 || Palomar || NEAT || — || align=right | 4.1 km || 
|-id=968 bgcolor=#d6d6d6
| 408968 ||  || — || July 17, 2002 || Palomar || NEAT || — || align=right | 2.7 km || 
|-id=969 bgcolor=#d6d6d6
| 408969 ||  || — || August 14, 2002 || Palomar || NEAT || THB || align=right | 3.3 km || 
|-id=970 bgcolor=#E9E9E9
| 408970 ||  || — || August 15, 2002 || Kitt Peak || Spacewatch || — || align=right data-sort-value="0.62" | 620 m || 
|-id=971 bgcolor=#d6d6d6
| 408971 ||  || — || February 4, 2000 || Kitt Peak || Spacewatch ||  || align=right | 3.4 km || 
|-id=972 bgcolor=#d6d6d6
| 408972 ||  || — || August 8, 2002 || Palomar || NEAT || — || align=right | 2.6 km || 
|-id=973 bgcolor=#fefefe
| 408973 ||  || — || August 27, 2002 || Palomar || NEAT || — || align=right data-sort-value="0.68" | 680 m || 
|-id=974 bgcolor=#d6d6d6
| 408974 ||  || — || August 18, 2002 || Palomar || NEAT || — || align=right | 3.4 km || 
|-id=975 bgcolor=#d6d6d6
| 408975 ||  || — || August 29, 2002 || Palomar || NEAT || — || align=right | 2.1 km || 
|-id=976 bgcolor=#d6d6d6
| 408976 ||  || — || August 17, 2002 || Palomar || NEAT || — || align=right | 2.7 km || 
|-id=977 bgcolor=#d6d6d6
| 408977 ||  || — || August 27, 2002 || Palomar || NEAT || — || align=right | 3.2 km || 
|-id=978 bgcolor=#d6d6d6
| 408978 ||  || — || August 28, 2002 || Palomar || NEAT || — || align=right | 2.9 km || 
|-id=979 bgcolor=#d6d6d6
| 408979 ||  || — || August 30, 2002 || Palomar || NEAT || — || align=right | 3.0 km || 
|-id=980 bgcolor=#FFC2E0
| 408980 ||  || — || September 11, 2002 || El Centro || W. K. Y. Yeung || APO || align=right data-sort-value="0.66" | 660 m || 
|-id=981 bgcolor=#fefefe
| 408981 ||  || — || September 4, 2002 || Palomar || NEAT || — || align=right data-sort-value="0.82" | 820 m || 
|-id=982 bgcolor=#FFC2E0
| 408982 ||  || — || September 20, 2002 || Palomar || NEAT || ATE || align=right data-sort-value="0.26" | 260 m || 
|-id=983 bgcolor=#E9E9E9
| 408983 ||  || — || September 5, 2002 || Xinglong || SCAP || — || align=right | 1.1 km || 
|-id=984 bgcolor=#d6d6d6
| 408984 ||  || — || September 17, 2002 || Palomar || NEAT || — || align=right | 3.1 km || 
|-id=985 bgcolor=#E9E9E9
| 408985 ||  || — || September 16, 2002 || Palomar || NEAT || — || align=right data-sort-value="0.93" | 930 m || 
|-id=986 bgcolor=#fefefe
| 408986 ||  || — || October 9, 2002 || Socorro || LINEAR || H || align=right data-sort-value="0.84" | 840 m || 
|-id=987 bgcolor=#E9E9E9
| 408987 ||  || — || October 3, 2002 || Palomar || NEAT || — || align=right | 2.8 km || 
|-id=988 bgcolor=#E9E9E9
| 408988 ||  || — || October 2, 2002 || Haleakala || NEAT || — || align=right | 1.4 km || 
|-id=989 bgcolor=#E9E9E9
| 408989 ||  || — || October 5, 2002 || Palomar || NEAT || — || align=right data-sort-value="0.96" | 960 m || 
|-id=990 bgcolor=#E9E9E9
| 408990 ||  || — || October 9, 2002 || Socorro || LINEAR || — || align=right data-sort-value="0.73" | 730 m || 
|-id=991 bgcolor=#E9E9E9
| 408991 ||  || — || October 10, 2002 || Palomar || NEAT || — || align=right | 1.1 km || 
|-id=992 bgcolor=#E9E9E9
| 408992 ||  || — || October 10, 2002 || Socorro || LINEAR || — || align=right | 1.4 km || 
|-id=993 bgcolor=#E9E9E9
| 408993 ||  || — || October 5, 2002 || Apache Point || SDSS || — || align=right data-sort-value="0.82" | 820 m || 
|-id=994 bgcolor=#E9E9E9
| 408994 ||  || — || October 5, 2002 || Apache Point || SDSS || — || align=right data-sort-value="0.92" | 920 m || 
|-id=995 bgcolor=#E9E9E9
| 408995 ||  || — || October 31, 2002 || Palomar || NEAT || — || align=right | 1.4 km || 
|-id=996 bgcolor=#E9E9E9
| 408996 ||  || — || October 29, 2002 || Apache Point || SDSS || — || align=right | 1.7 km || 
|-id=997 bgcolor=#E9E9E9
| 408997 ||  || — || October 31, 2002 || Palomar || NEAT || — || align=right | 1.3 km || 
|-id=998 bgcolor=#d6d6d6
| 408998 ||  || — || November 5, 2002 || Socorro || LINEAR || — || align=right | 3.3 km || 
|-id=999 bgcolor=#E9E9E9
| 408999 ||  || — || November 6, 2002 || Haleakala || NEAT || — || align=right | 1.3 km || 
|-id=000 bgcolor=#E9E9E9
| 409000 ||  || — || November 12, 2002 || Socorro || LINEAR || — || align=right | 1.0 km || 
|}

References

External links 
 Discovery Circumstances: Numbered Minor Planets (405001)–(410000) (IAU Minor Planet Center)

0408